= Street (disambiguation) =

A street is a public thoroughfare in a built environment.

Street may also refer to:

== Places ==
- Street (crater), a crater on the Moon named after the astronomer Thomas Street
- Street, Devon, England, United Kingdom
- Street, Somerset, England, United Kingdom
- Street, County Westmeath (civil parish), barony of Moygoish, Ireland
- Street, County Westmeath, Ireland
- Street, Maryland, United States
- Street Mountain (New York), in the Street Range of the Adirondack Mountains, United States

== Music ==
- Street (Herman Brood & His Wild Romance album), a 1997 album by Dutch rock band Herman Brood & His Wild Romance
- Street (EXID album), a 2016 album by South Korean girl group EXID
- Street (Nina Hagen album), 1991
- "Street", a song by G Herbo from the 2017 album Humble Beast

== People ==
- Street (surname)

== Other uses ==
- Honda Street, a kei van

== See also ==
- The Street (disambiguation)
- Street people (disambiguation)
- Streeter (disambiguation)
- Streets (disambiguation)
- Mean Streets (disambiguation)
- Strait
