= Vincent van Gogh Painting Sunflowers =

1888 painting by Paul Gauguin

- Van Gogh peignant des tournesols (French)
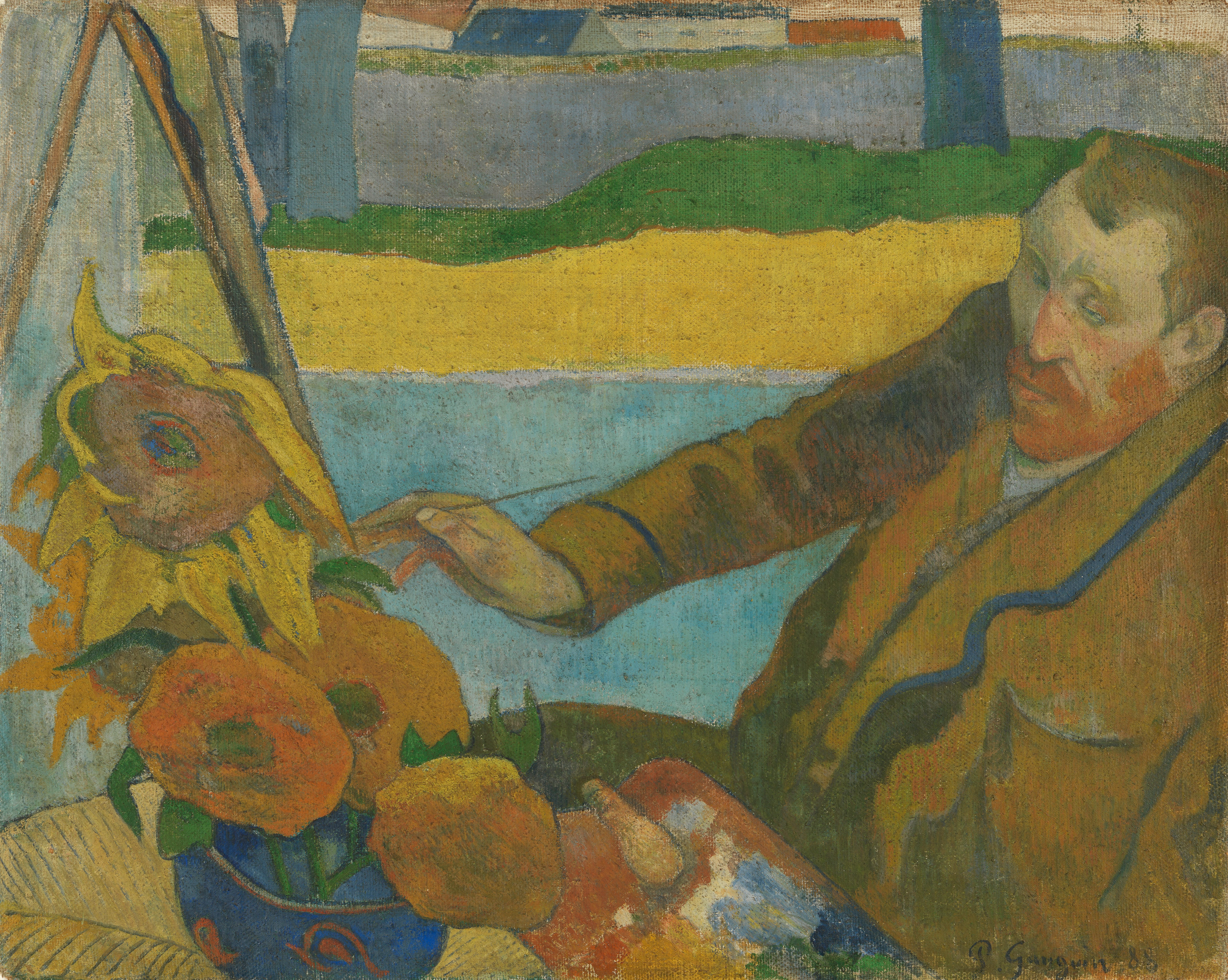
- Artist: Paul Gauguin
- Year: 1888
- Medium: Oil on burlap
- Dimensions: 73 cm × 91 cm (29 in × 36 in)
- Location: Van Gogh Museum, Amsterdam

Vincent van Gogh Painting Sunflowers also known as The Painter of Sunflowers is a portrait of Vincent van Gogh by Paul Gauguin. Van Gogh is depicted sitting before an easel, presumably painting his "Sunflower" series. The work, which is a piece from Gauguin's "Arles Period", was created in Arles, France, in December, 1888. The painting is in the collection of the Van Gogh Museum in Amsterdam.

== Background ==
The portrait was painted when Gauguin lived with Van Gogh in Arles. Van Gogh had asked Gauguin to stay with him and form an art colony that he referred to as "The Studio of the South". After much urging and extensive correspondences, Gauguin agreed to move to Arles in October, 1888. Gauguin was financially supported by Van Gogh's brother, Theo Van Gogh, who paid Gauguin a stipend of 150 francs in return for completing one painting a month.

Gauguin stayed in Arles from October to December, during which time the two artists found themselves regularly at odds. They had differing opinions in regards to artistic expression and freedom of representation, and their contrasting beliefs led to tension between them.

The completed painting was shipped to Theo Van Gogh on December 20, 1888, shortly after an incident between the artists during which Van Gogh allegedly threw a glass of absinthe in Gauguin's face. Days later, on December 23, 1888, a disagreement with Gauguin was followed by the famous incident of Van Gogh severing his own left ear with a razor. Afterwards, Gauguin wrote to Theo saying, "Everything considered, I am obliged to return to Paris. Vincent and I simply cannot live together without trouble, due to the incompatibility of our characters, and we both need tranquility to work".

Gauguin admitted that his portrait of Van Gogh was not a perfect likeness, but he felt that he had captured his friend's intimate character. Van Gogh's initial impression of the painting was that Gauguin had depicted him as a madman; he stated, "It is certainly I, but I gone mad". He later softened his view, saying, "My face has lit up after all a lot since, but it was indeed me, extremely tired and charged with electricity as I was then."

== Composition ==
Bedroom in Arles, Vincent van Gogh, 1888

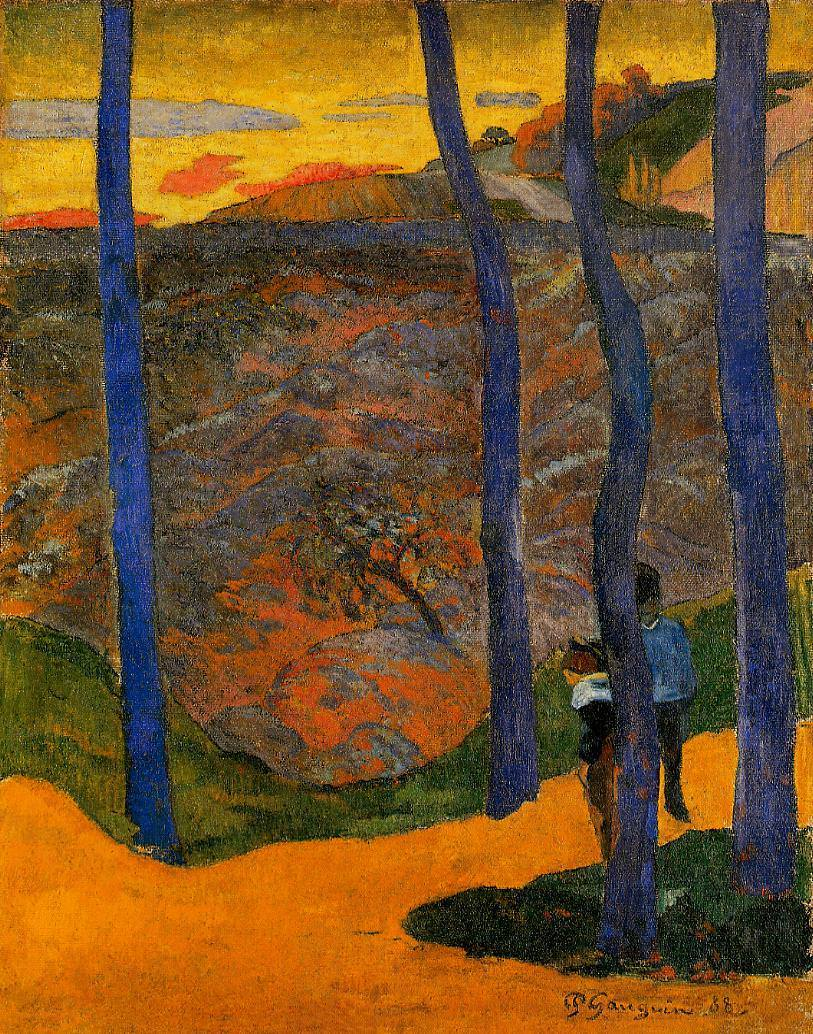
Blue Tree Trunks. Arles, Paul Gauguin, 1888

The painting shows Van Gogh working in what he called "The Yellow House", and it includes recognizable features of other notable works. For example, the blue walls in the painting are also visible in Van Gogh's Bedroom in Arles, and the chair Van Gogh is seated in is likely the same as the one depicted in the painting Van Gogh's Chair. Hanging on the wall behind Van Gogh we can see an enlarged portion of one of Gauguin's paintings. It was not uncommon for Gauguin to display his own paintings in the background of his works, and the one depicted here is most similar to his painting Blue Trees.

Though Gauguin would have viewed Van Gogh painting many times, it is likely that this portrait scene was done mostly from memory. A key indicator of this is that the work was completed in the winter of 1888, but depicts a scene from the summer, suggesting that Gauguin developed the concept of the painting first, and then later added details observed from life.

In the painting, Gauguin depicts Van Gogh as seen from above, sunken into his chair with his eyes slightly closed. Art historians have noted that Van Gogh's head appears distorted, with a sloping shape and flat features. From this composition, some have suggested that Gauguin was representing Van Gogh's deteriorating mental state, rather than his true likeness.

== Style and influences ==
Gauguin's early work was still indebted to the Impressionist style, an artistic movement that centered around painting from observation and capturing transient moments. From his time in Arles, however, Gauguin's work is considered to be Post-Impressionist, due to its developed individual style and departure from observed appearances.

Though Gauguin and Van Gogh worked closely together, they had different influences on the style of their painting. While at Arles, Gauguin stated in a letter that Van Gogh "admires Daudet, Daubigny, Ziem and the great Rousseau, all people I cannot understand, and on the other hand he detests Ingres, Raphael, Degas, all people whom I admire."

== Chemical analysis ==
X-radiographs of the canvas and microscopic analysis of the paint reveal that the work was likely done on a coarse, jute fabric, and used a palette of optically pure lead pigments including white, vermillion, chrome yellow, synthetic ultramarine, and more. The X-radiograph also revealed the areas of the painting that are most dense with paint, such as the foreground figure, the wall and the sunflowers. These areas of heavily applied paint suggest that Gauguin likely blocked out the composition first, then built up the paint as he worked.

== Ownership ==
The painting remained in Theo Van Gogh's possession from 1888 until his death in 1891, after which it was passed down through his family until eventually being given to the Van Gogh Foundation in 1962. The painting has been since placed in the Vincent Van Gogh Museum in Amsterdam from its opening in 1973.

== See also ==
- Van Gogh's Sunflowers series
- List of paintings by Paul Gauguin
