= Décoration for the Yellow House =

1888 painting series by Vincent van Gogh

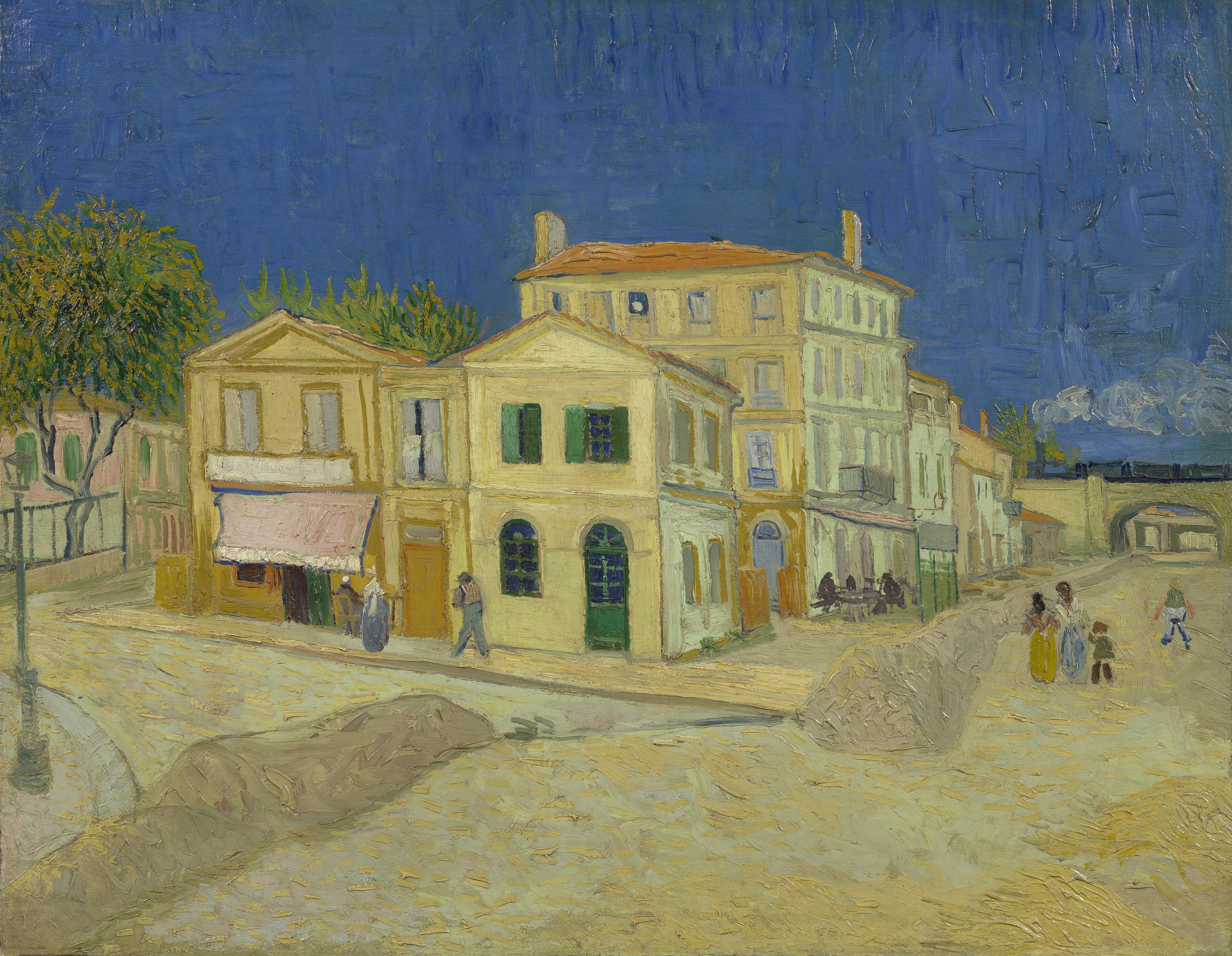
Vincent van Gogh, The Yellow House, 1888, Van Gogh Museum, Amsterdam (F464)

Décoration for the Yellow House was the main project Vincent van Gogh focused on in Arles, from August 1888 until his breakdown the day before Christmas. This Décoration had no pre-defined form or size; the central idea of the Décoration grew step by step, with the progress of his work. Starting with the Sunflowers, portraits were included in the next step. Finally, mid-September 1888, the idea took shape: from this time on he concentrated on size 30 canvases (Toiles de 30), which were all meant to form part of this Décoration.

== First idea: The Sunflowers, August 1888 ==
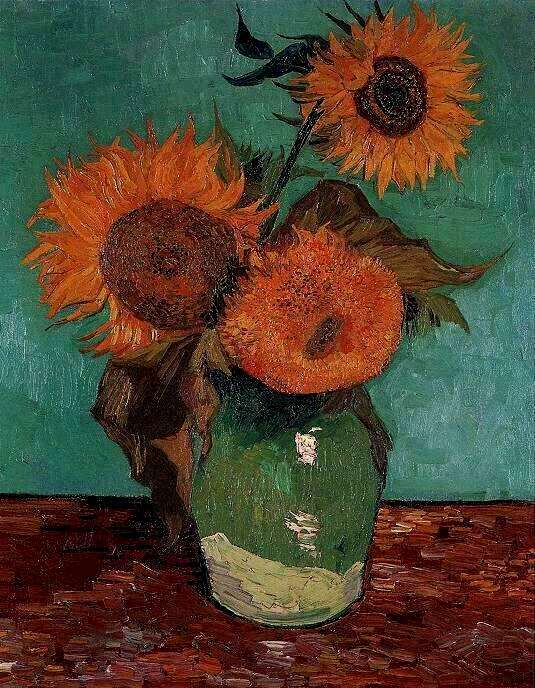
Vase with Three Sunflowers
(Arles, August 1888)
Private collection

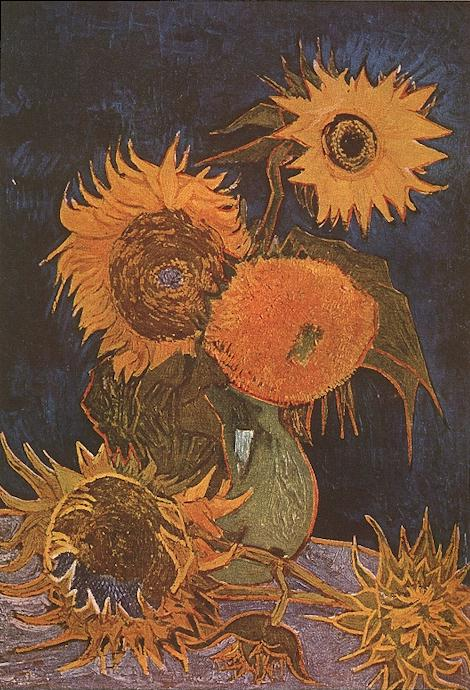
Vase with Six Sunflowers
(Arles, August 1888)
Private collection, Japan, destroyed by fire in World War II on 6 August 1945

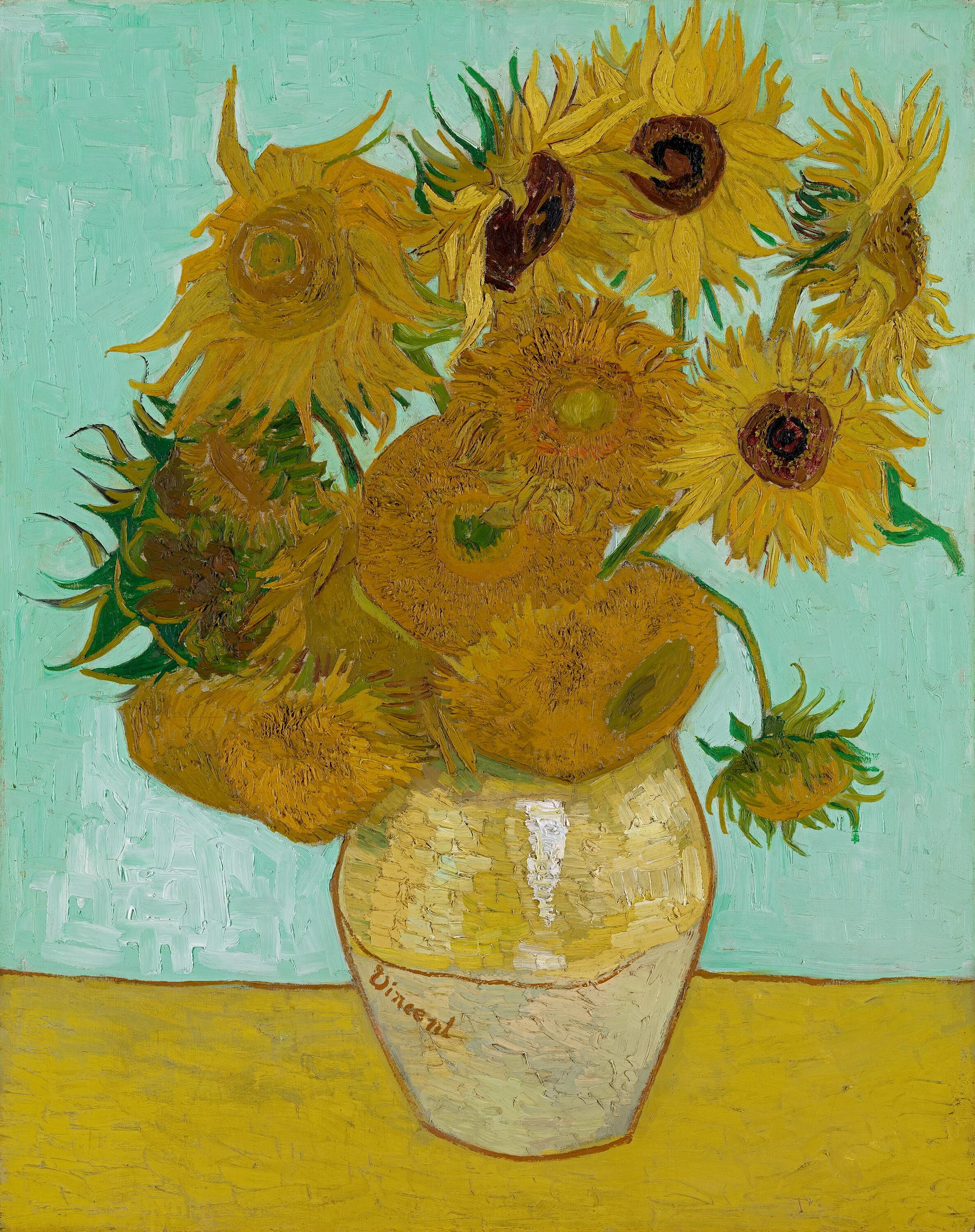
Vase with Twelve Sunflowers
(Arles, August 1888)
Neue Pinakothek, Munich

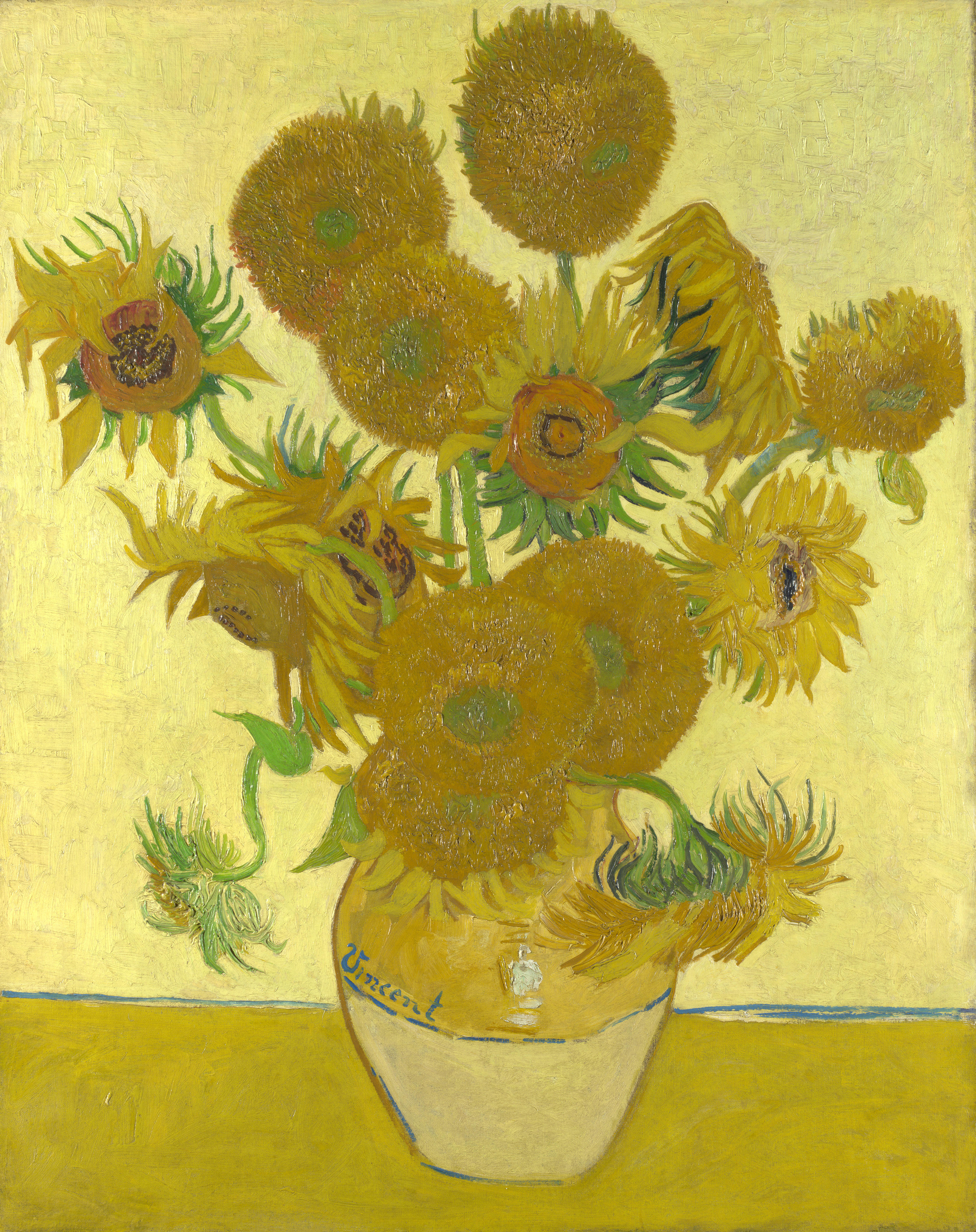
Vase with Fifteen Sunflowers
(Arles, August 1888)
National Gallery, London

== Second step: The Portraits, September – October 1888 ==
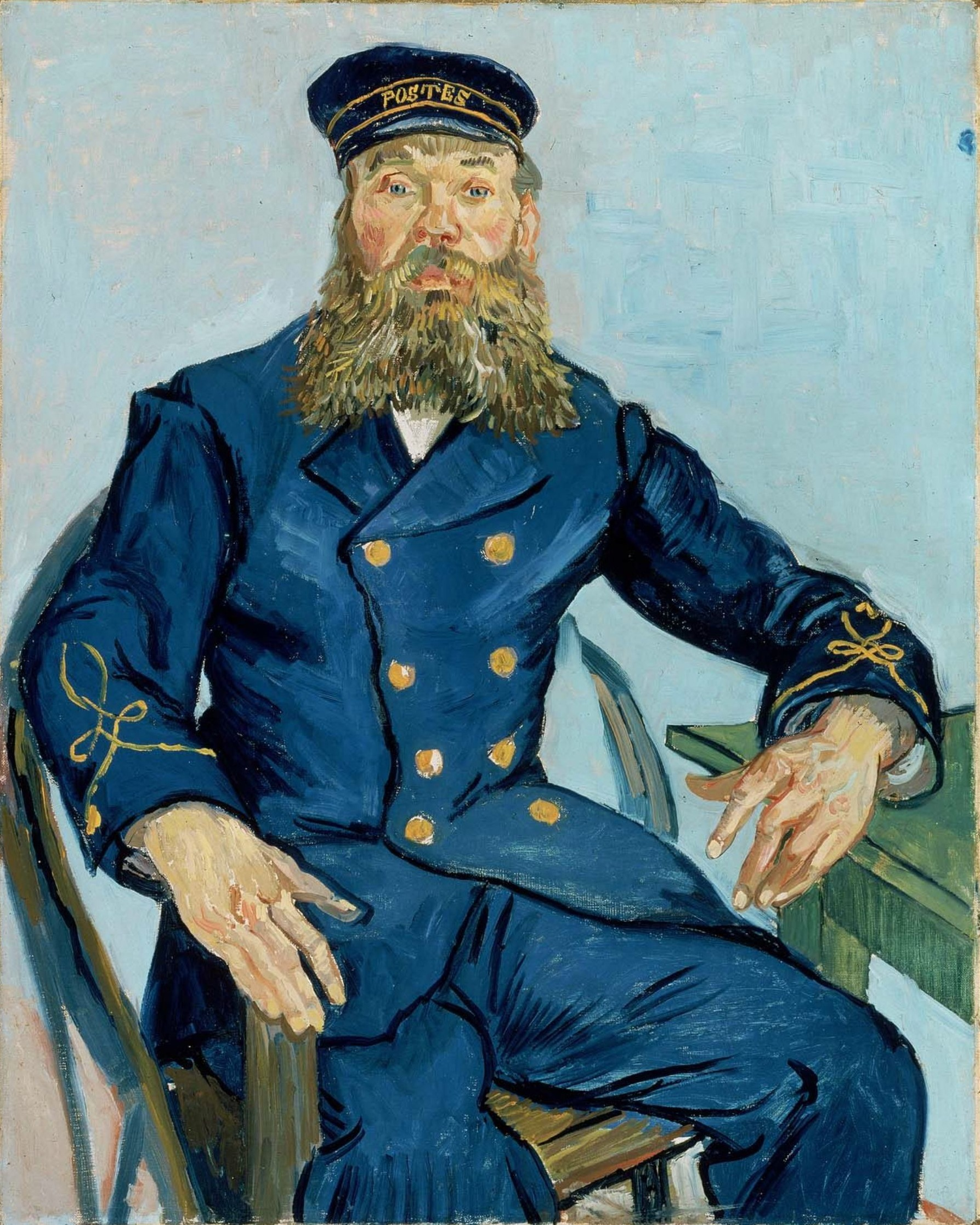
Joseph Roulin
(The Postmaster)
Museum of Fine Arts, Boston

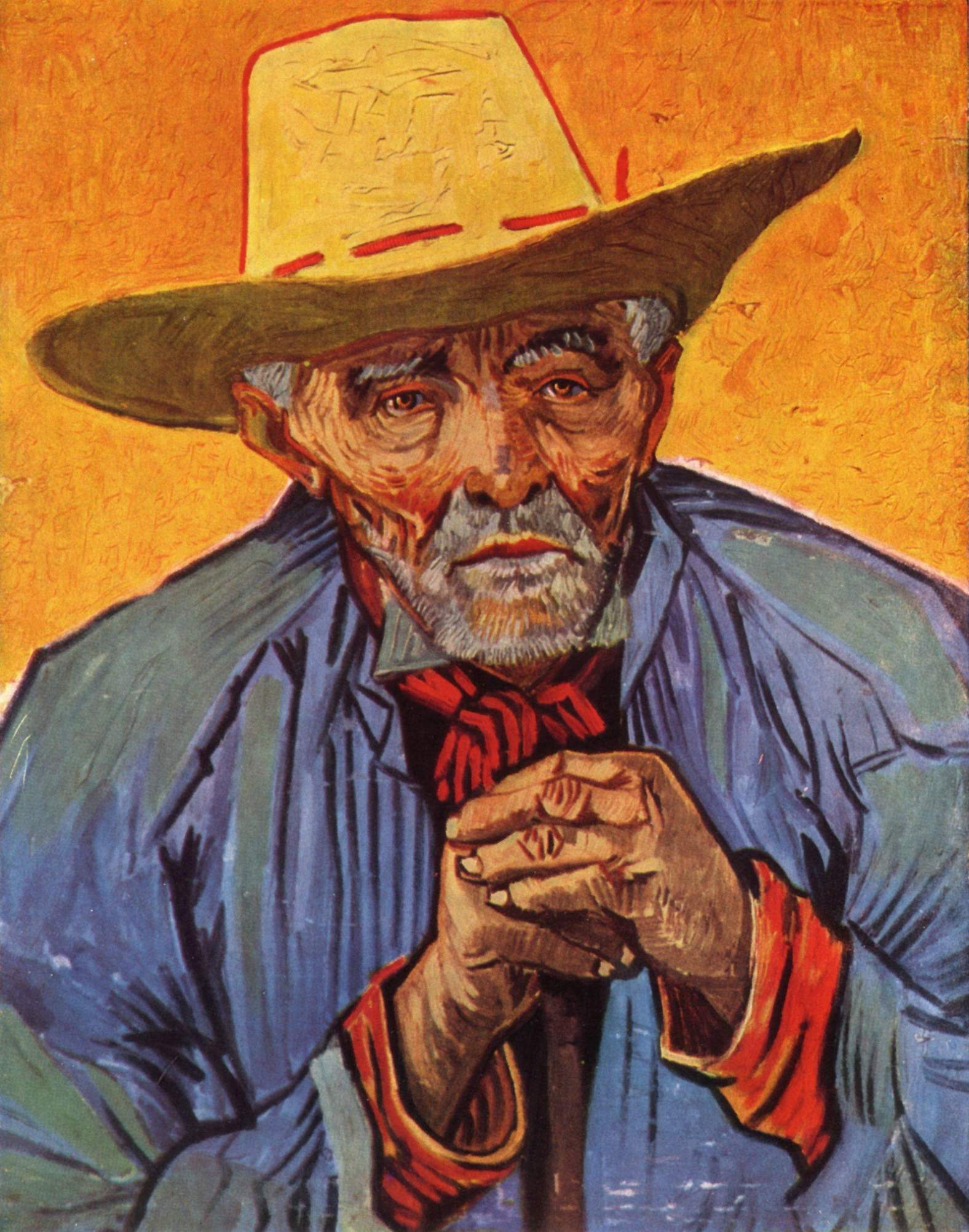
Patience Escalier
(The Old Peasant)
Private collection

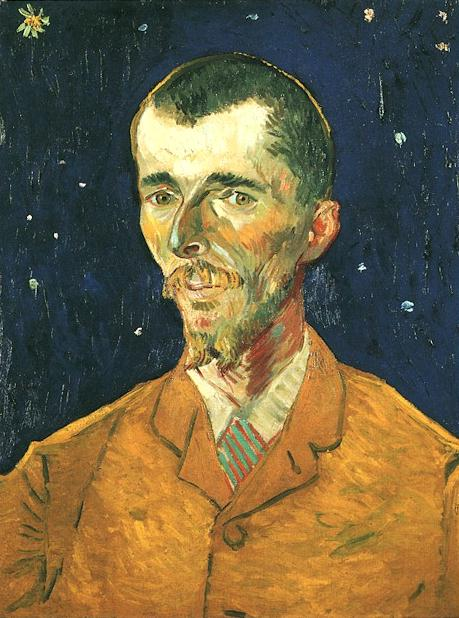
Eugène Boch
(The Poet)
Musée d'Orsay, Paris

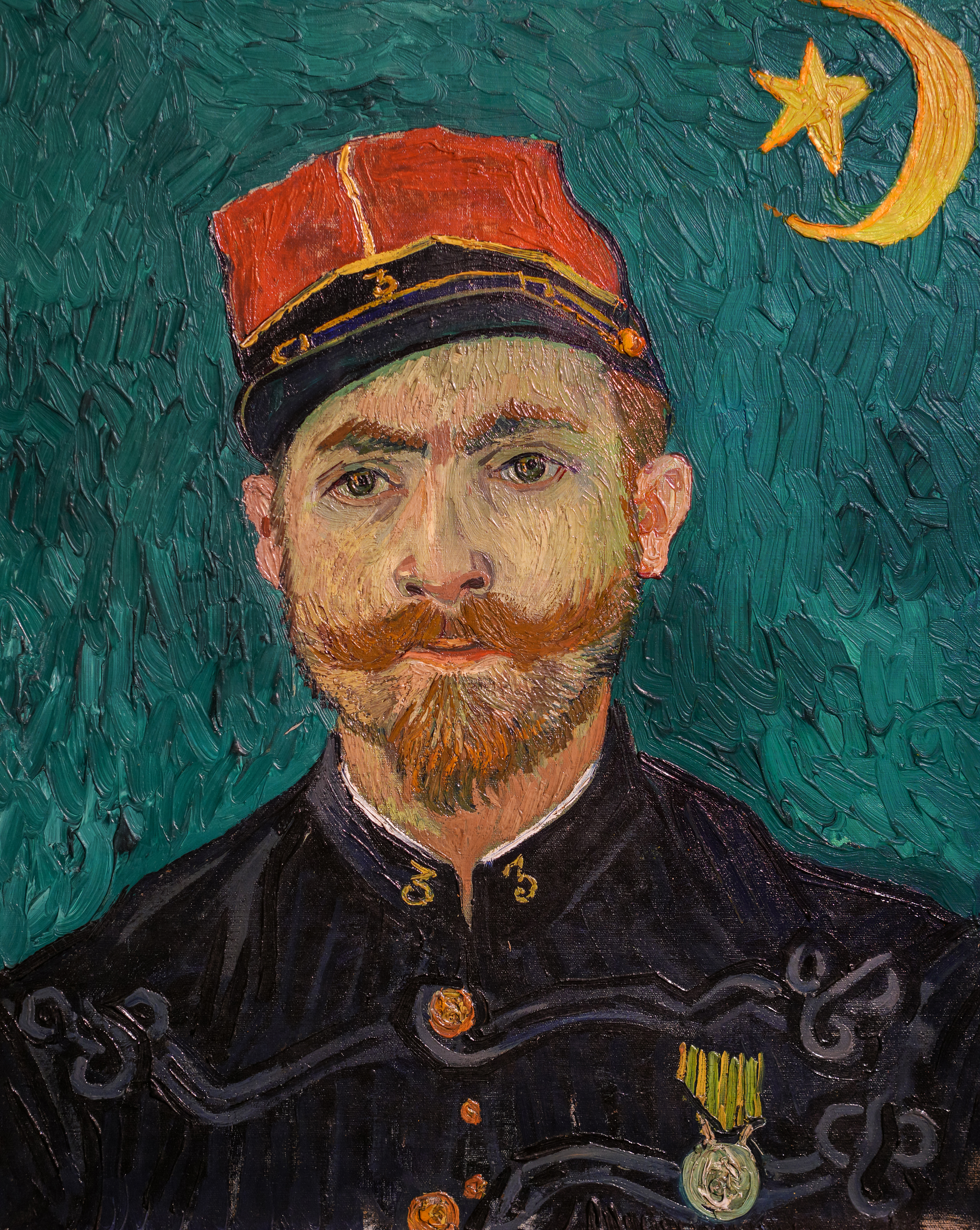
Paul-Eugène Milliet
(The Lover)
Kröller-Müller Museum, Otterlo

== Third step and definite solution: The Toiles de 30-Décoration, October – December 1888 ==
The Night Café
(September 1888)
Yale University Art Gallery

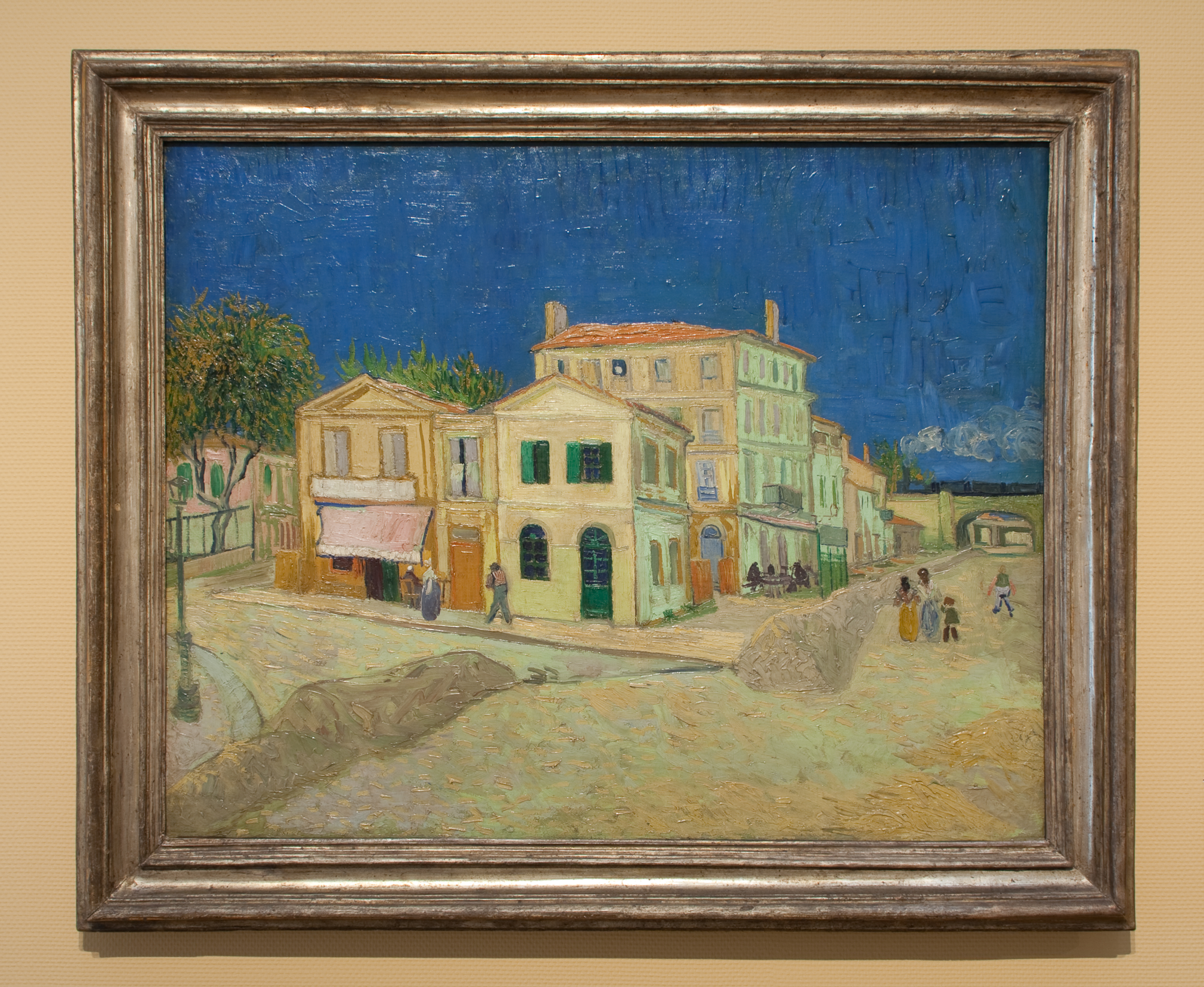
The Yellow House
(September 1888)
Van Gogh Museum, Amsterdam

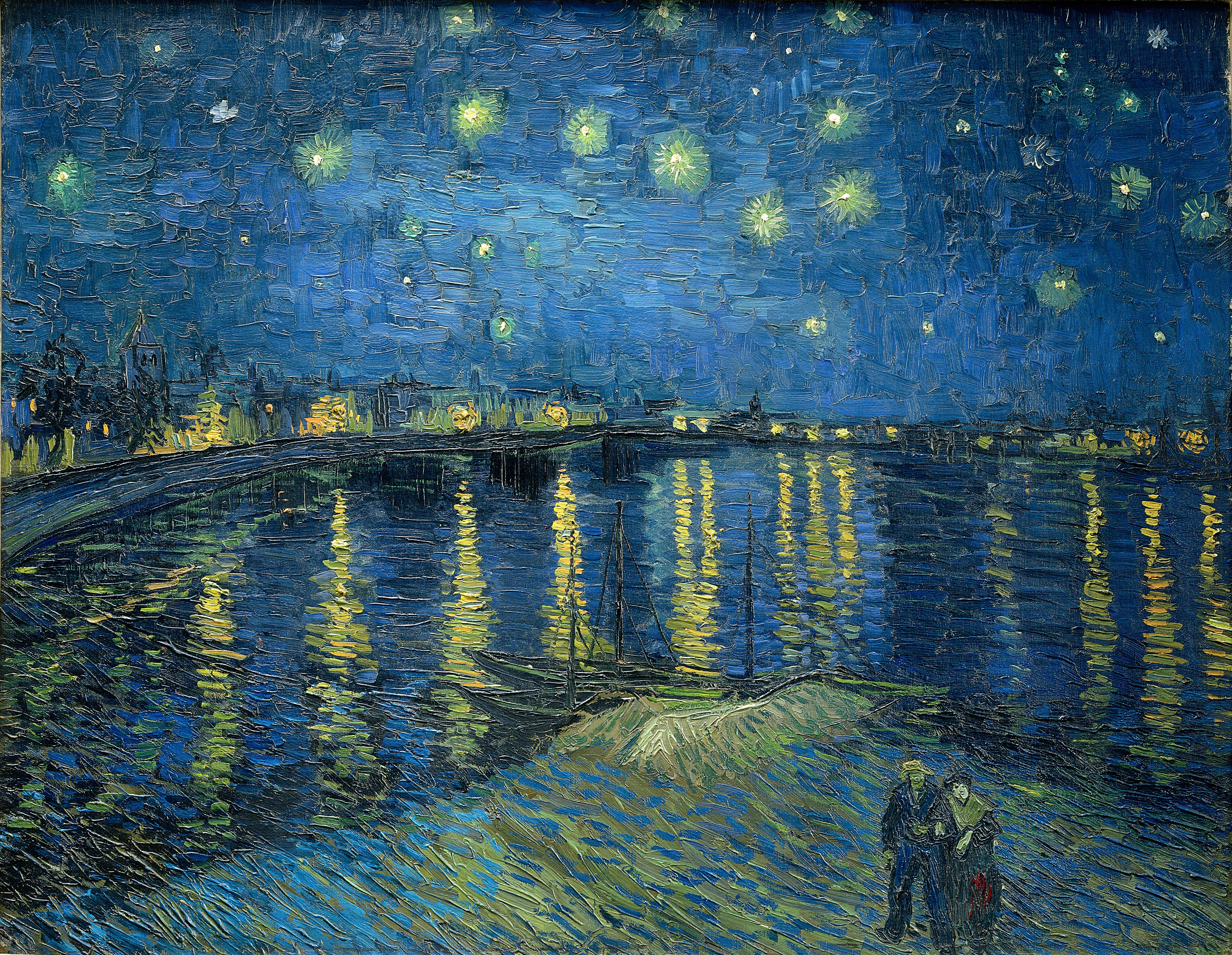
Starry Night Over the Rhone
(September 1888)
Musée d'Orsay, Paris

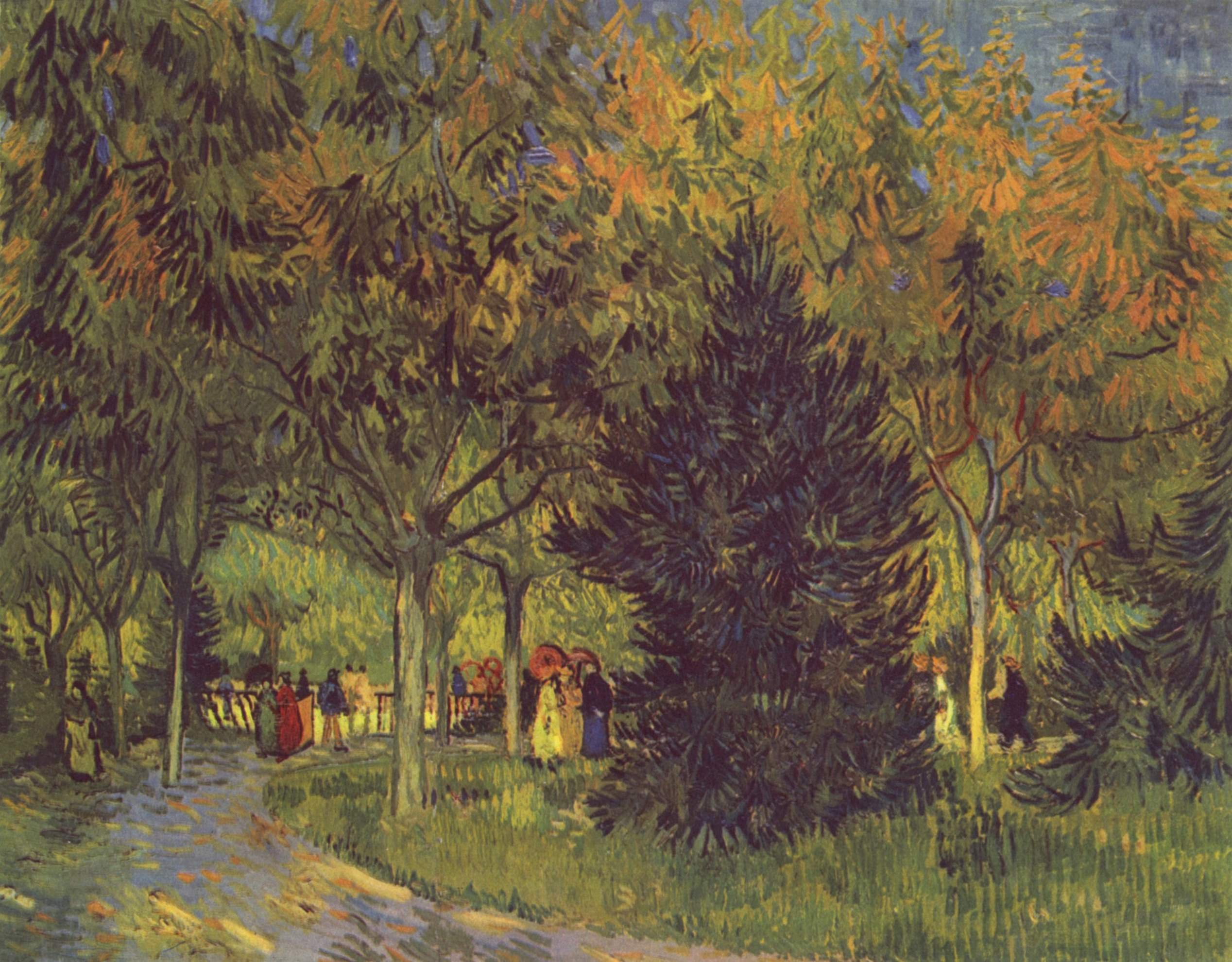
Public Garden
Kröller-Müller Museum, Otterlo

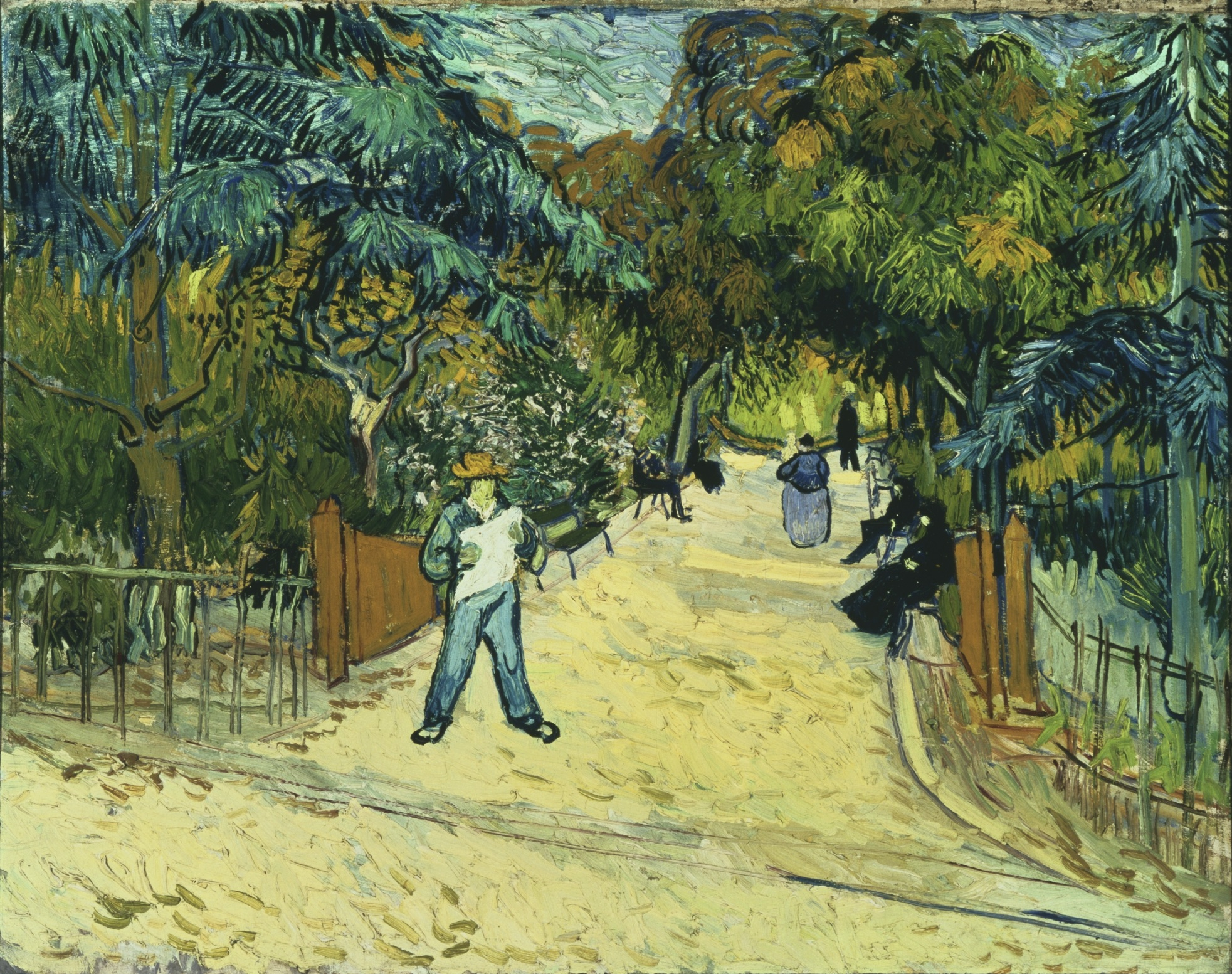
Public garden
Phillips Collection, Washington D.C.

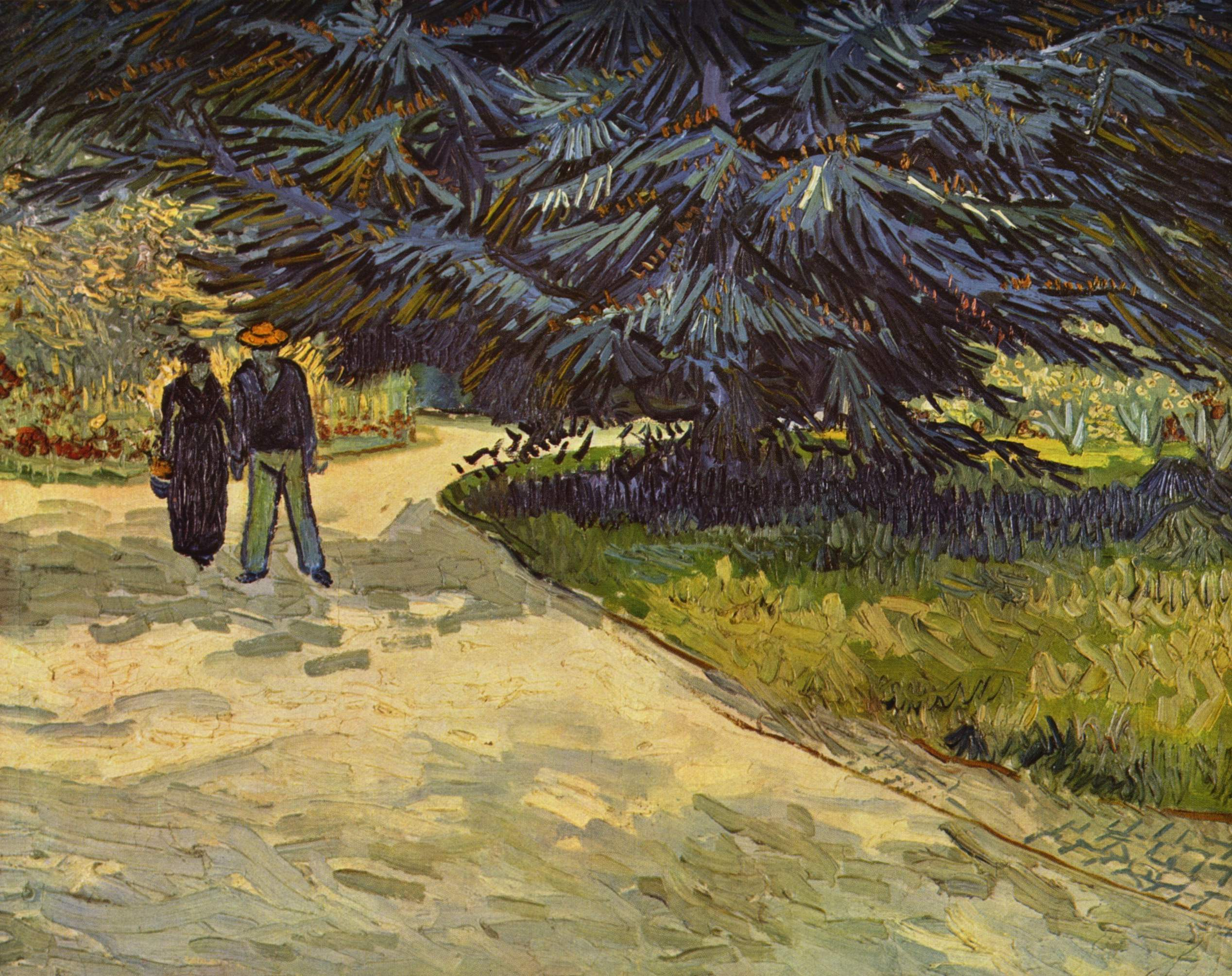
Garden of the Poet III
(October 1888)
Private collection

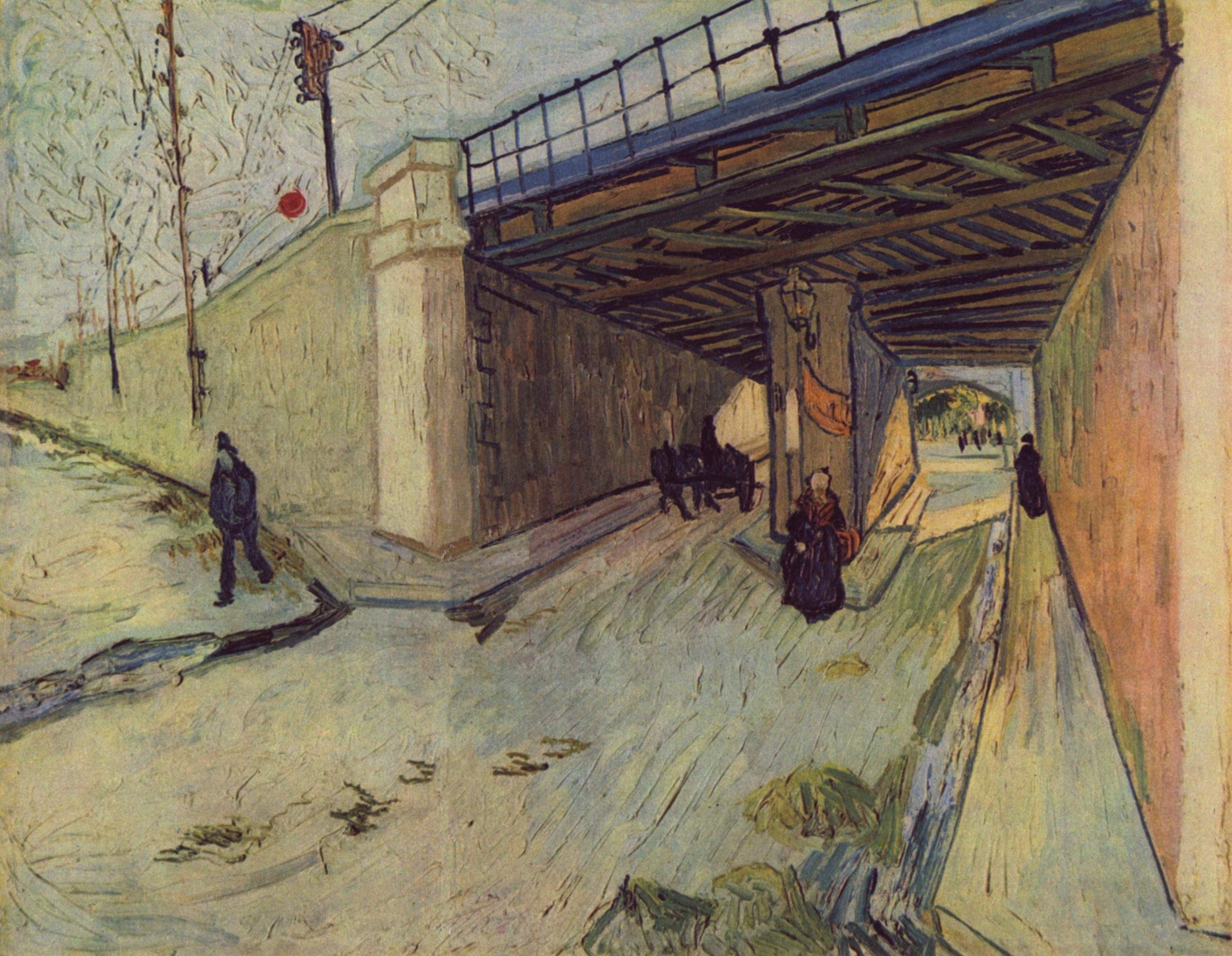
Railway Bridge
(October 1888)
Private collection

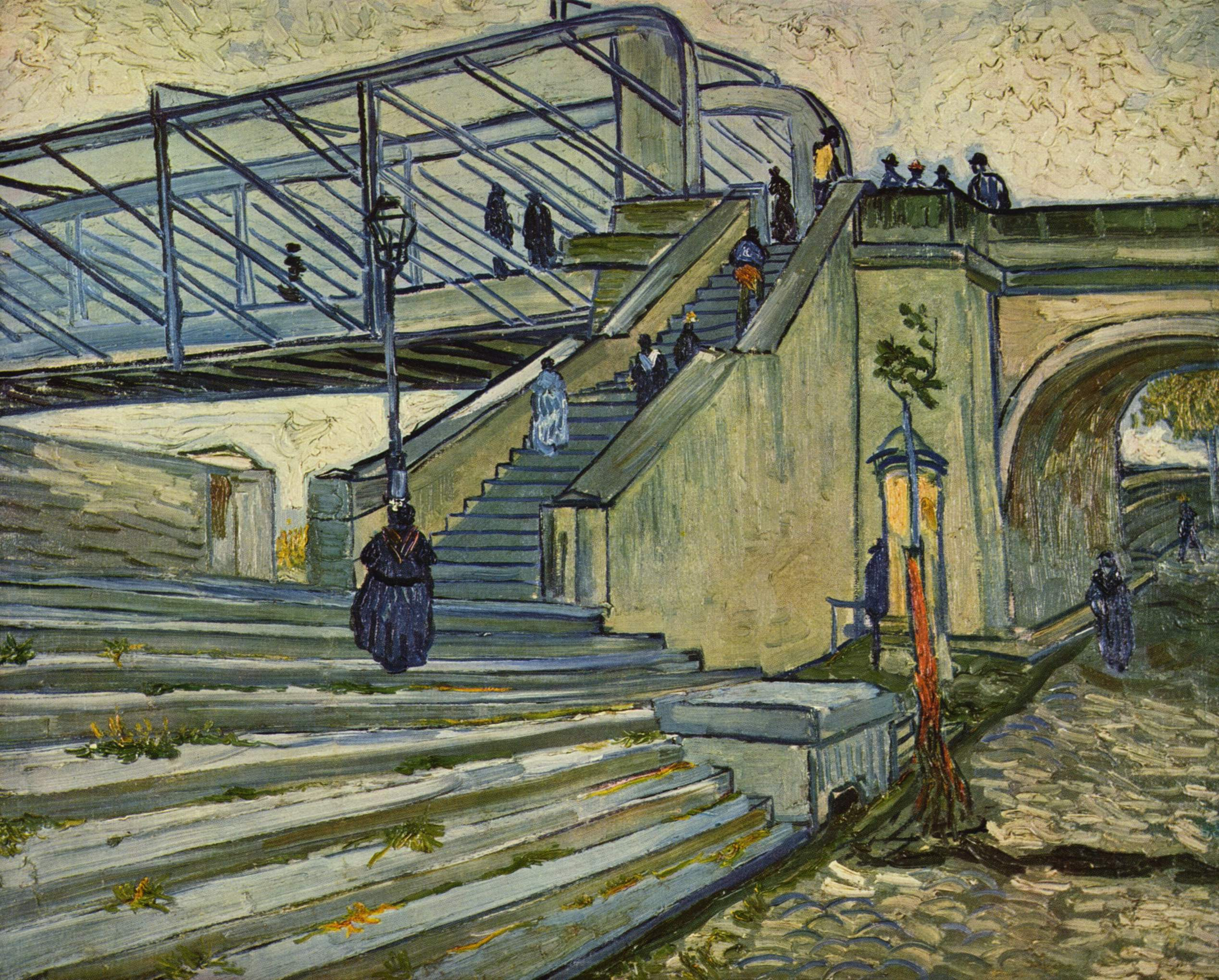
Trinquetaille Bridge
(October 1888)
Private collection

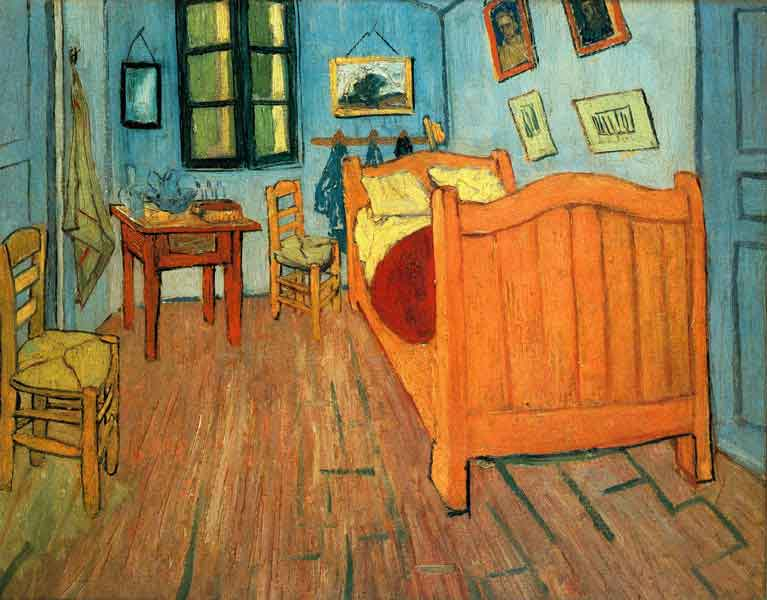
Bedroom in Arles
(October 1888)
Van Gogh Museum, Amsterdam

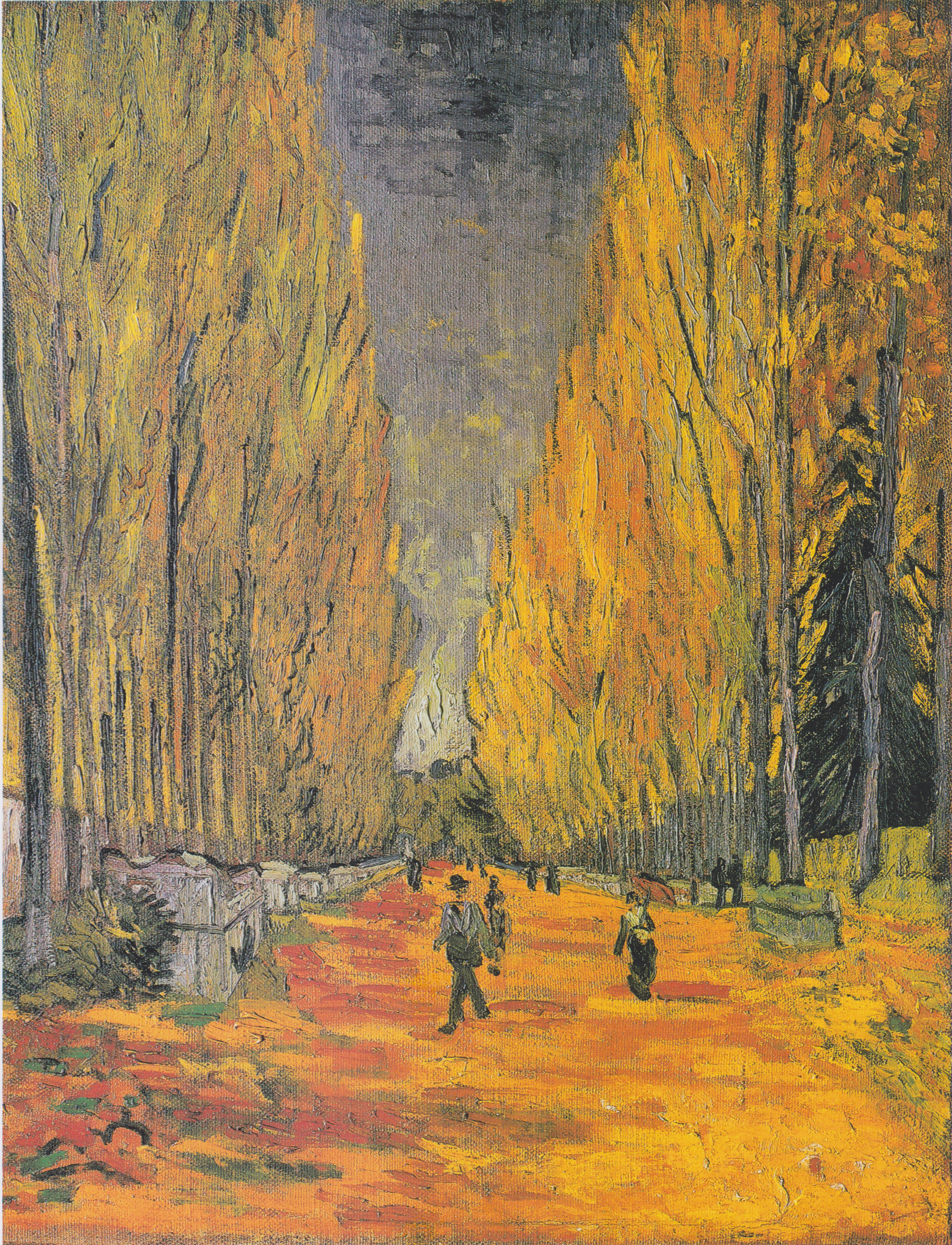
Les Alyscamps
(October 1888)
Private collection

The Red Vineyard
(November 1888) sold to Anna Boch
Moscow

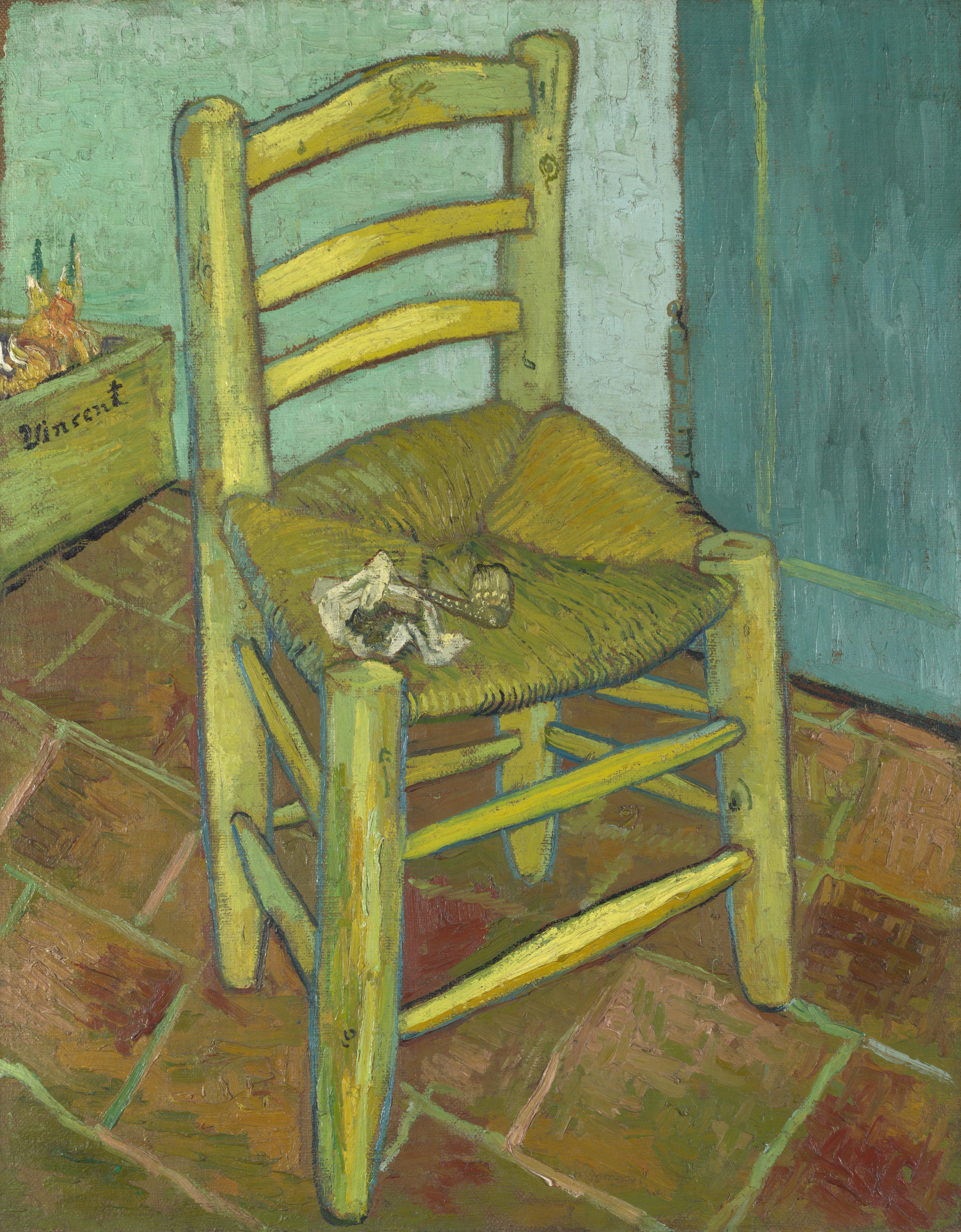
Van Gogh's Chair
(November 1888)
National Gallery, London

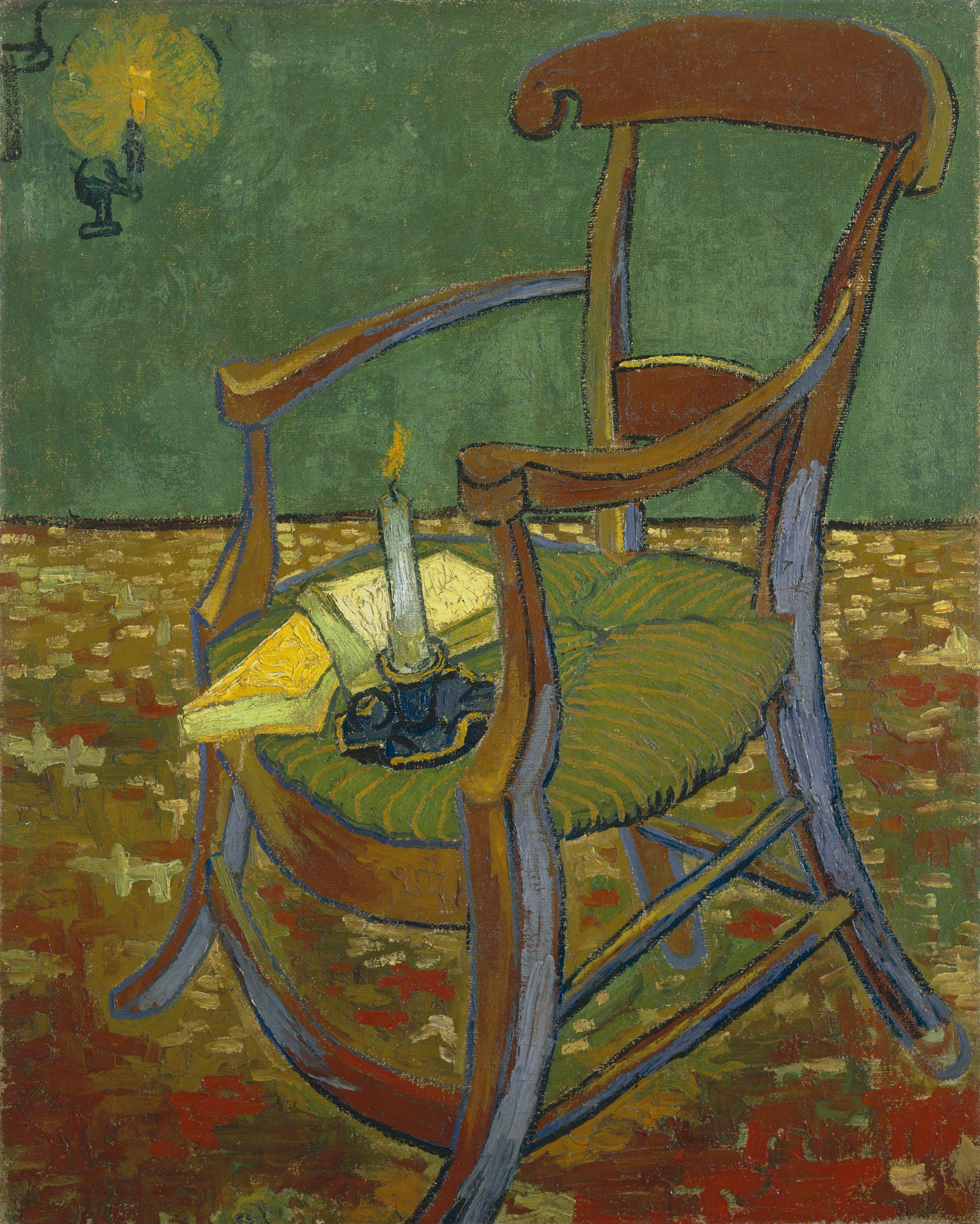
Gauguin's Armchair
(November 1888)
Van Gogh Museum, Amsterdam

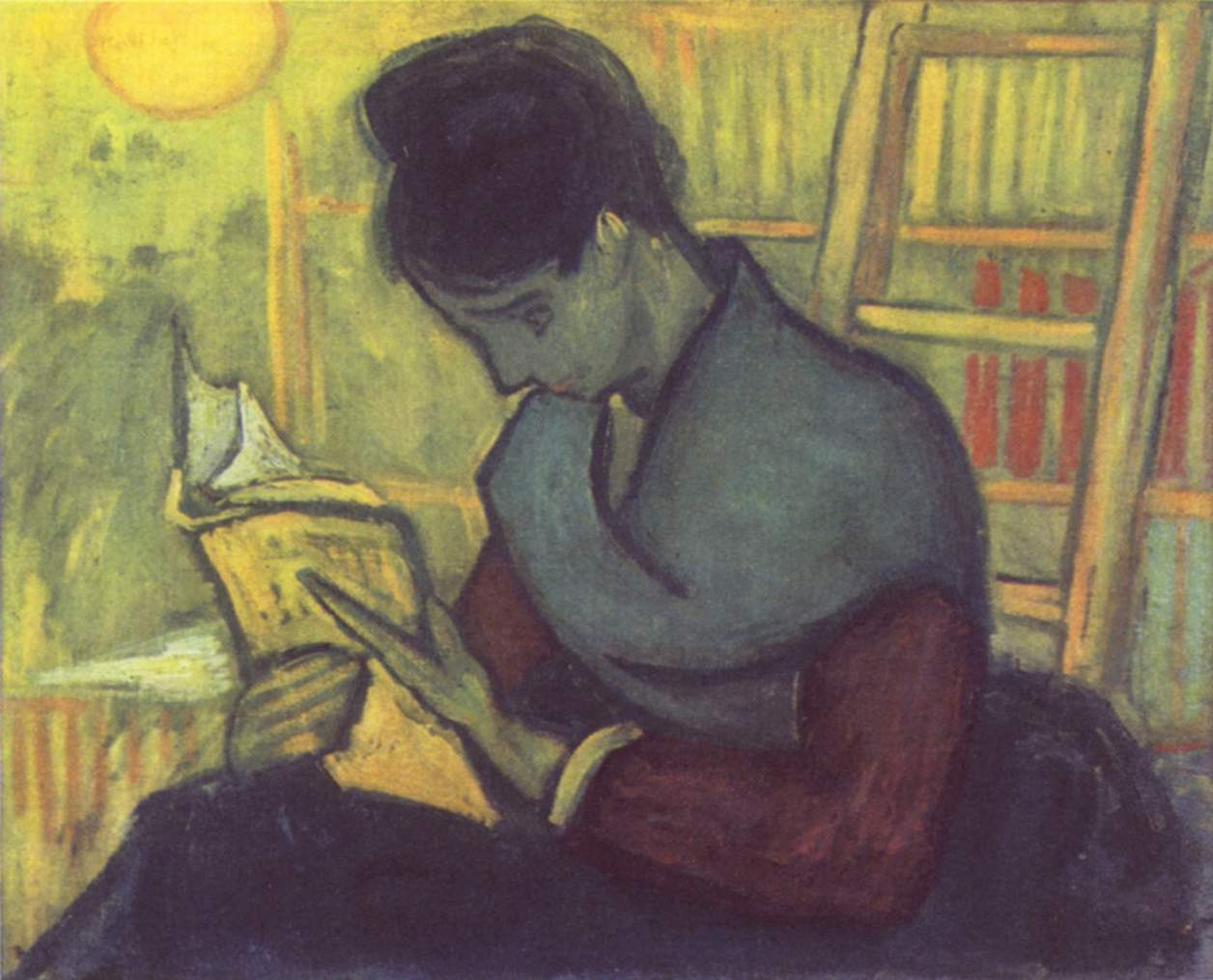
In the Library
(November 1888)
Private collection

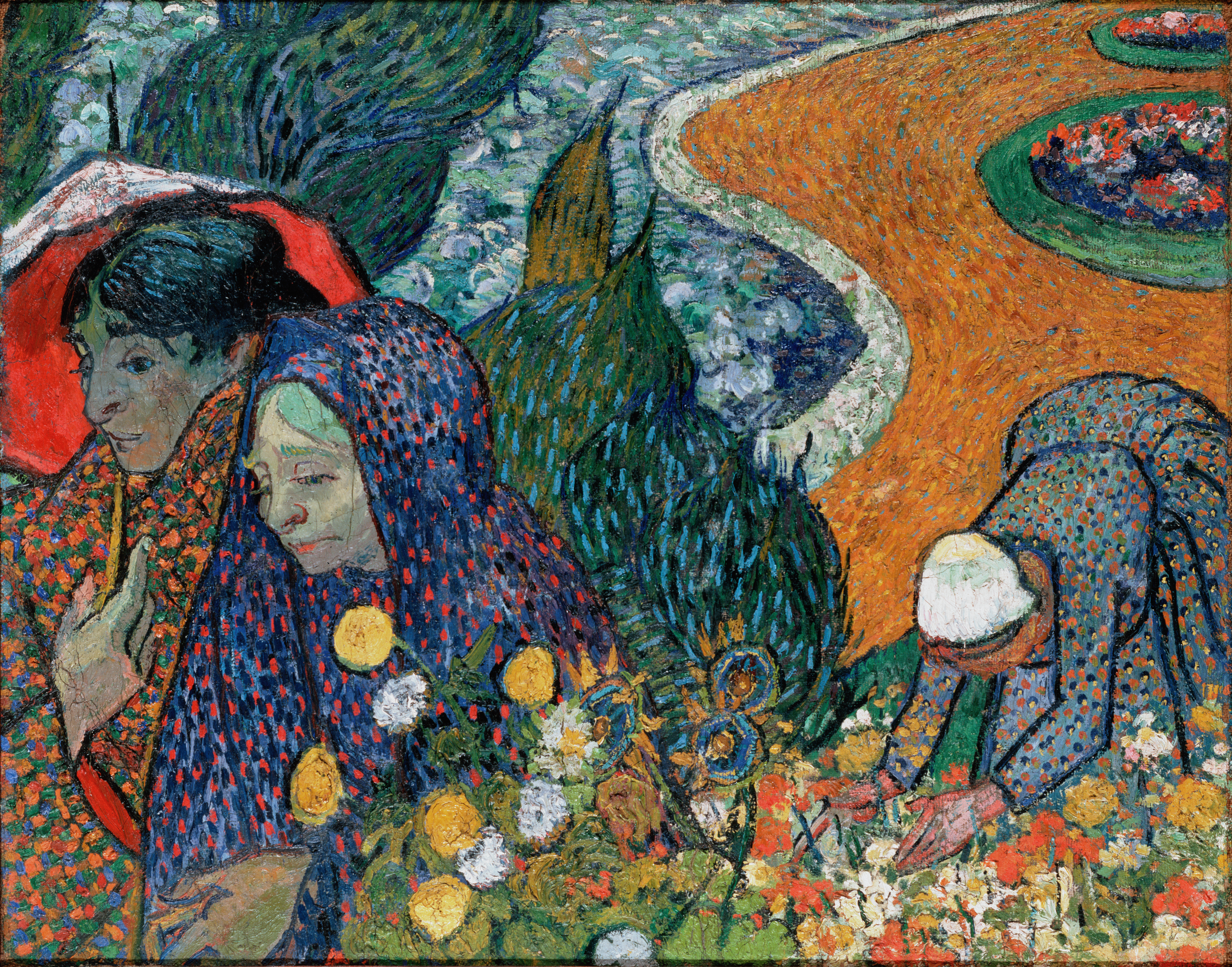
Souvenir du jardin
(November 1888)
Hermitage Museum, St. Petersburg

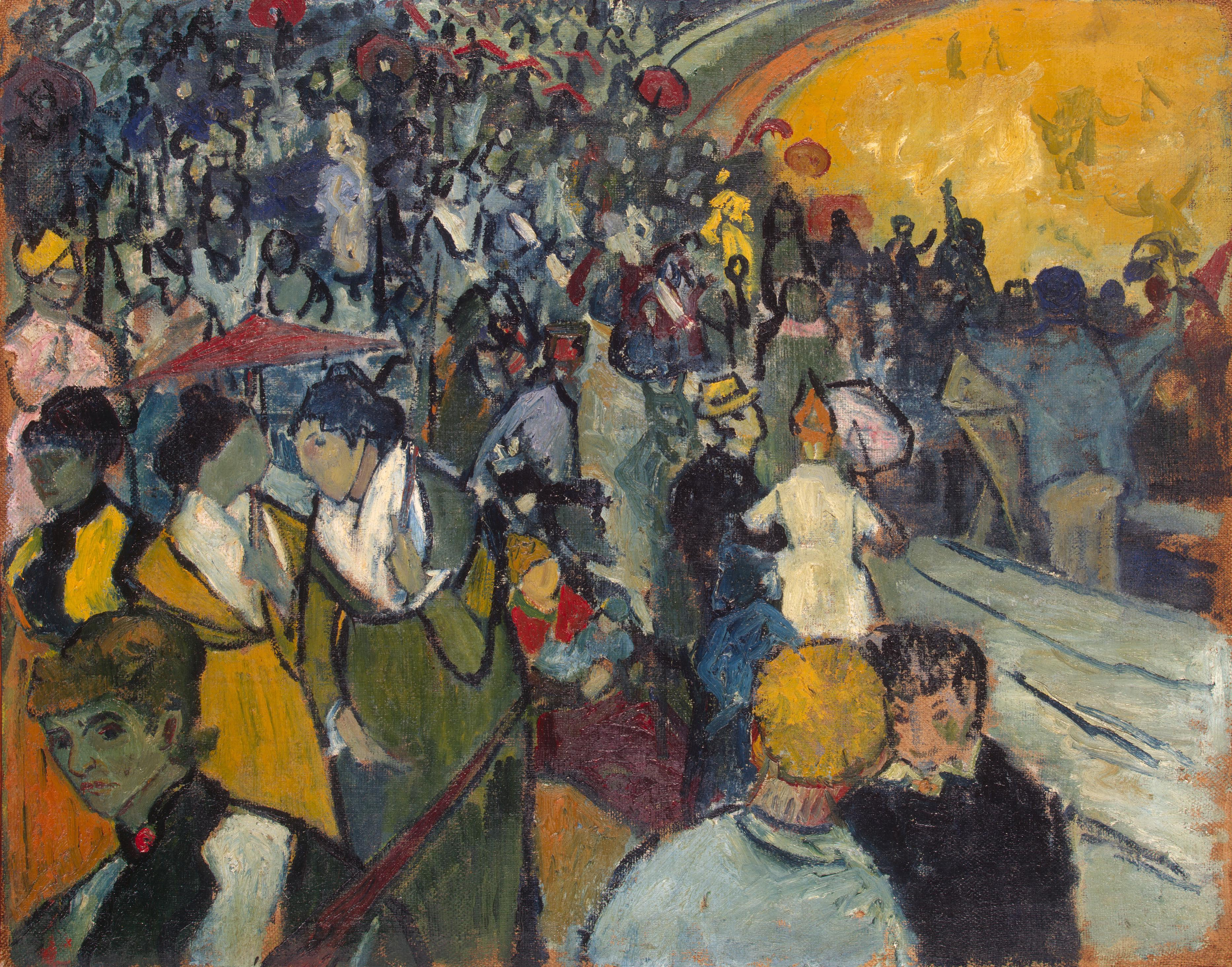
Les Arènes
(December 1888)
Hermitage Museum, St. Petersburg

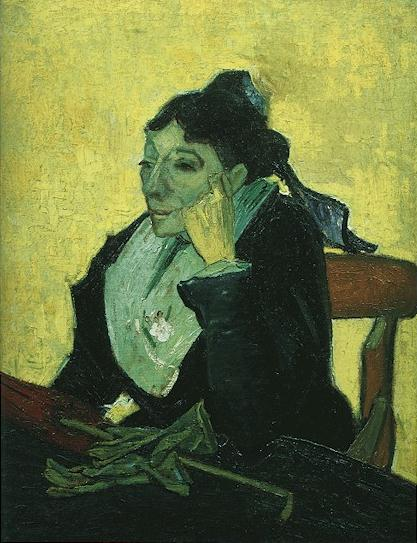
L'Arlésienne
(November 1888)
Musée d'Orsay, Paris

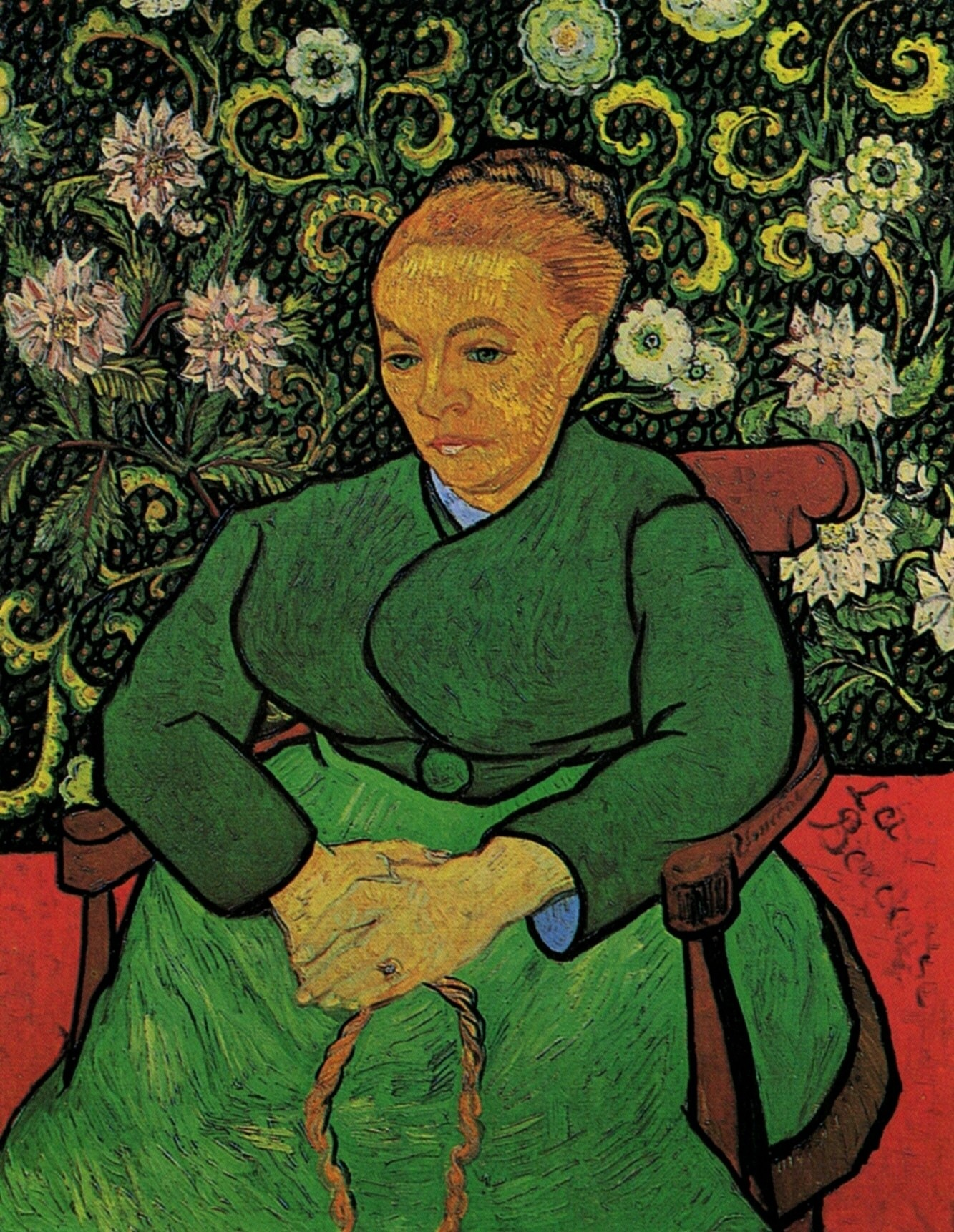
La Berceuse
(December 1888)
Kröller-Müller Museum, Otterlo
- For a related project by Van Gogh executed at the same time, in November/December 1888, see The Roulin Family series

== Epilogue: The Toiles de 30, January – April 1889 ==
=== Repetitions ===
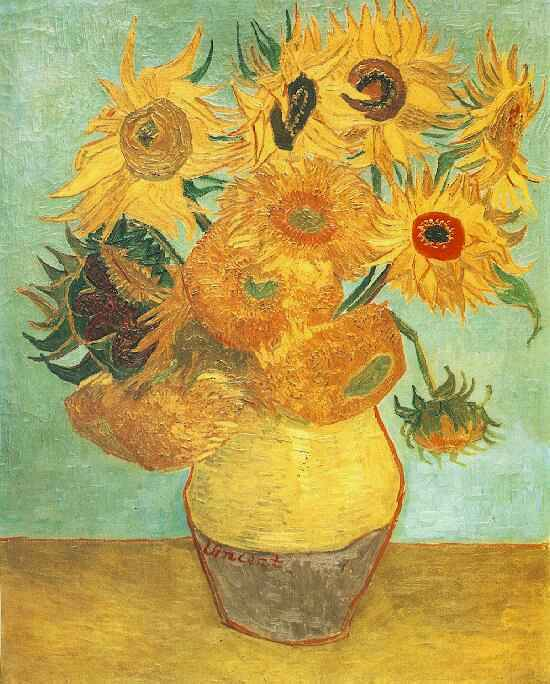
Vase with Twelve Flowers
(Arles, January 1889)
Philadelphia Museum of Art, Philadelphia

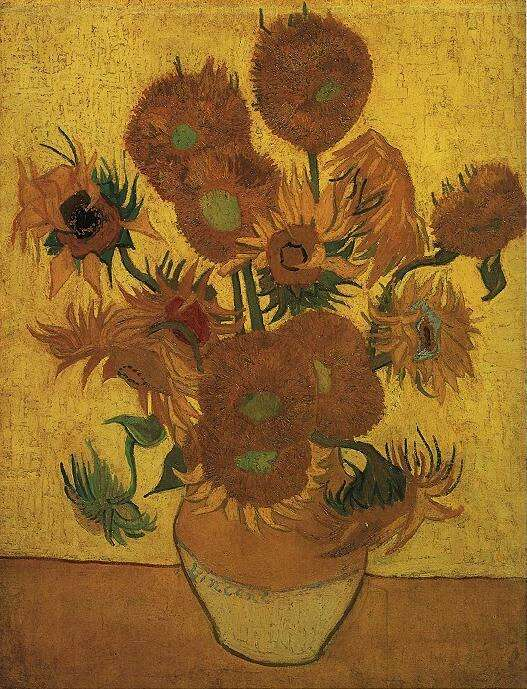
Vase with Fifteen Sunflowers
(Arles, January, 1889)
Van Gogh Museum, Amsterdam

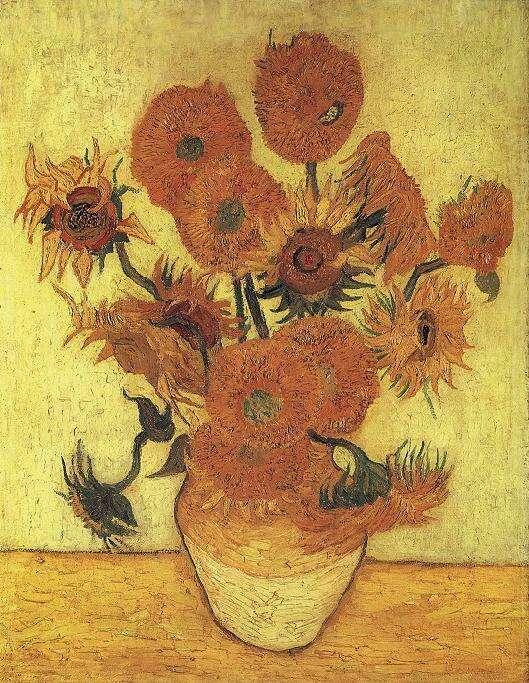
Vase with Fifteen Sunflowers
(Arles, January 1889)
Sompo Japan Museum of Art, Tokyo

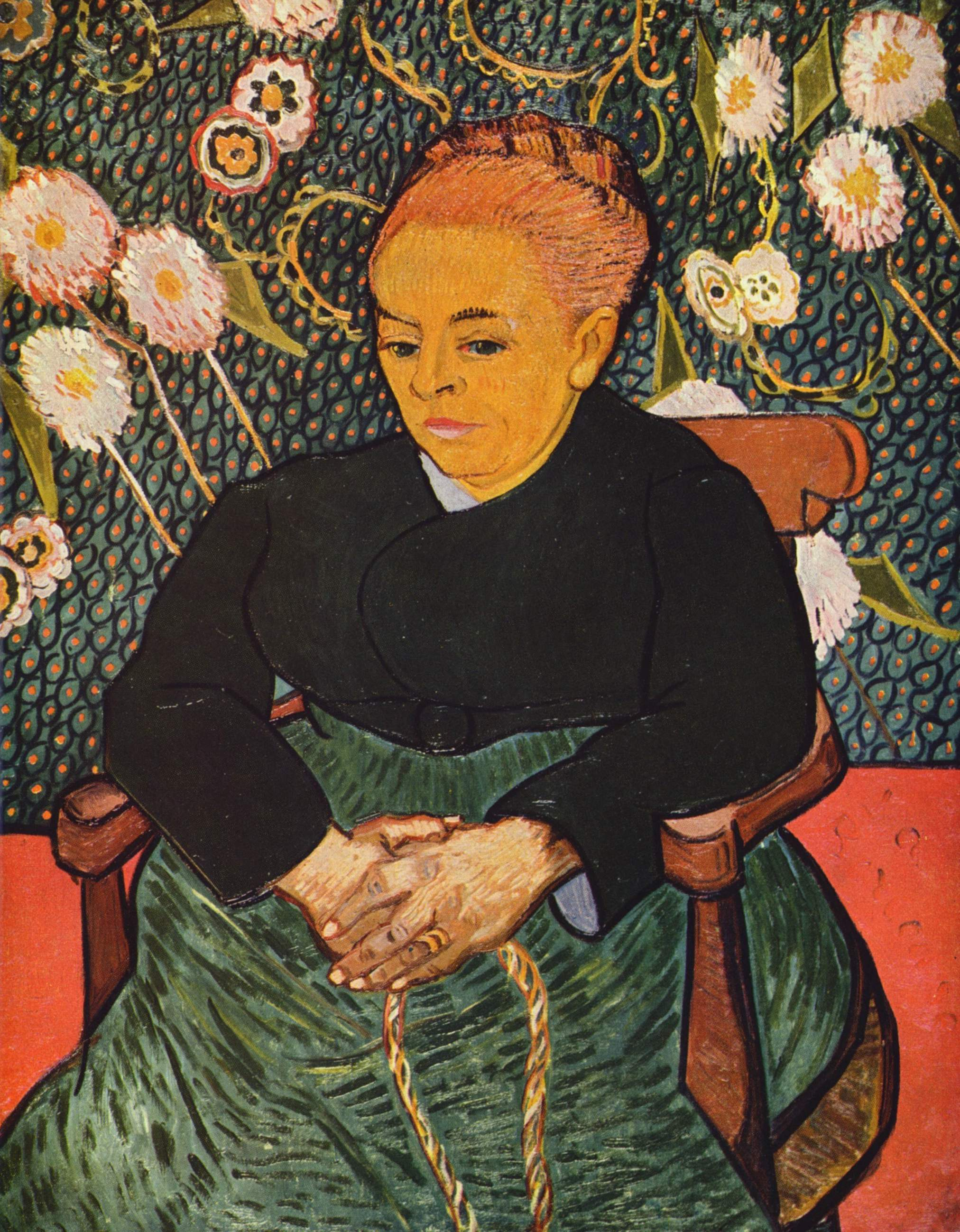
La Berceuse
Museum of Fine Arts, Boston

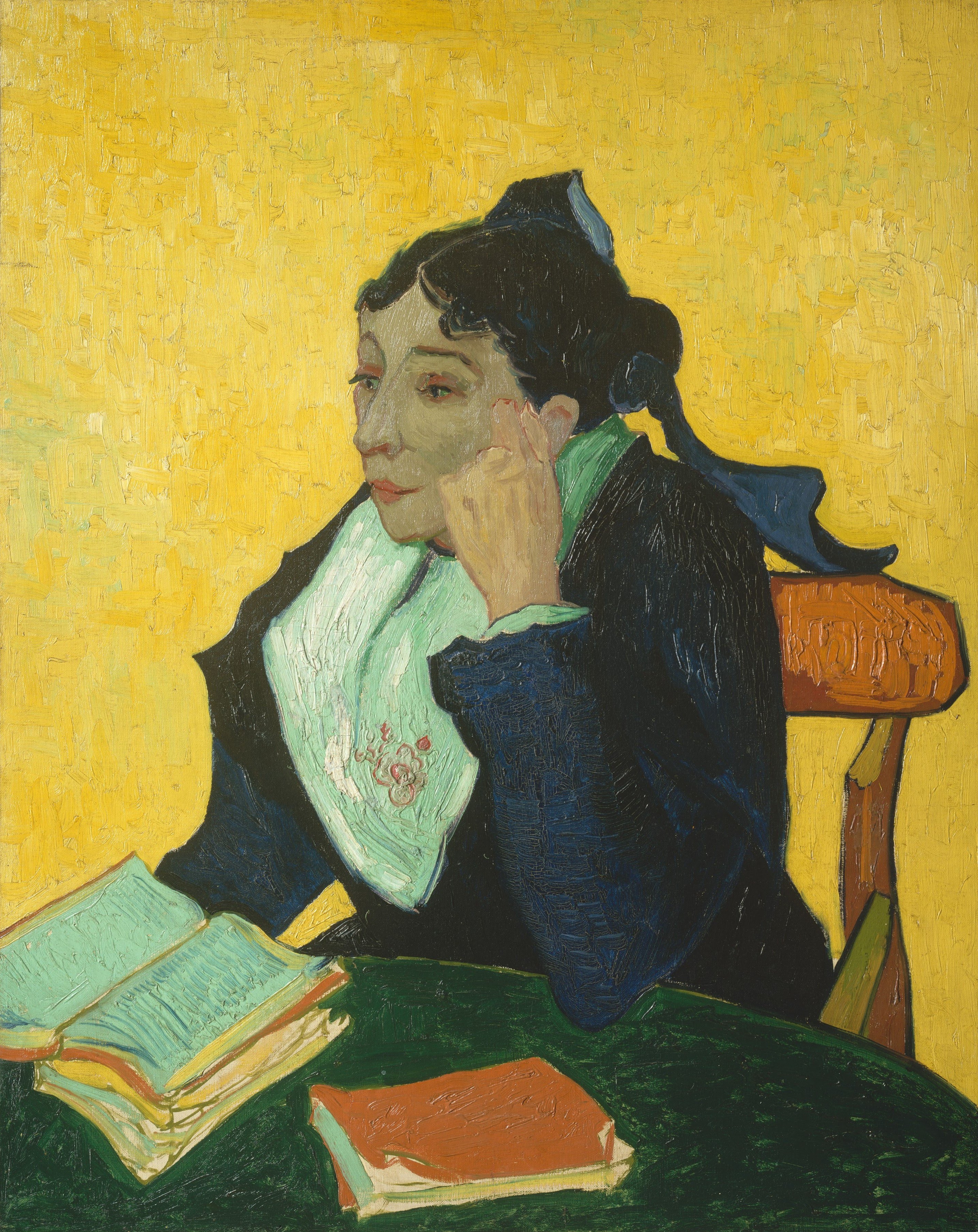
L'Arlésienne
Metropolitan Museum of Art, New York

=== Spring Subjects ===
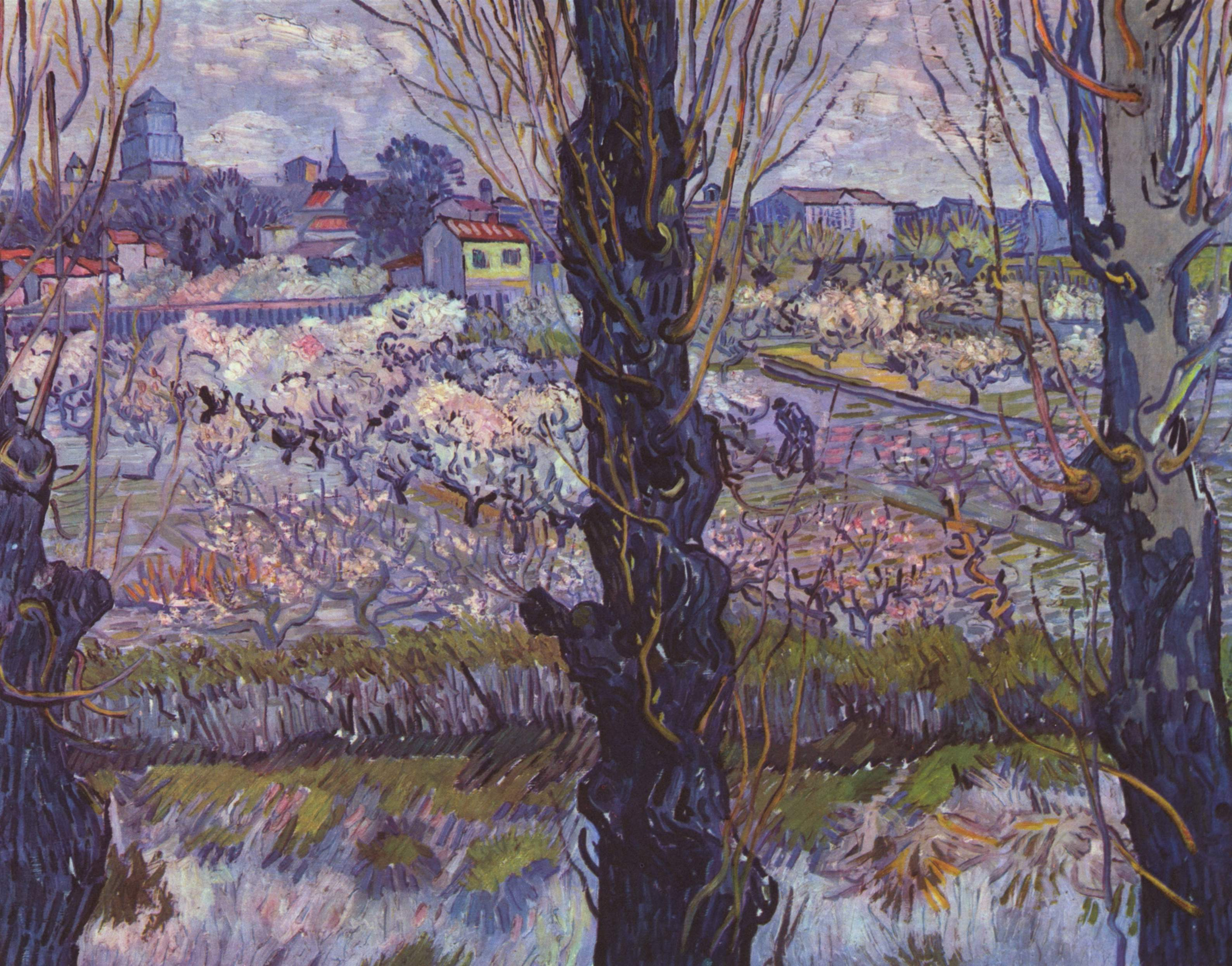
View of Arles, Flowering Orchards, spring 1889
Neue Pinakothek, Munich

=== Continuation ===
Later, in Saint-Rémy as well as in Auvers, size 30 canvases form the body of Van Gogh's work, and he continued conceiving series and groups of work based on this size. See The Wheat Field, the Copies by Vincent van Gogh and the Display at Les XX 1890, all from Saint-Rèmy, and the Auvers size 30 canvases.

== See also ==
- List of works by Vincent van Gogh

== Resources ==
=== References ===
- Roland Dorn (1990). Décoration: Vincent van Goghs Werkreihe für das Gelbe Haus in Arles. Georg Olms Verlag. ISBN 978-3-487-09098-6.
