= Streets =

Streets is the plural of street, a type of road.

Streets or The Streets may also refer to:

== Music ==
- Streets (band), a rock band fronted by Kansas vocalist Steve Walsh
- Streets (punk album), a 1977 compilation album of various early UK punk bands
- Streets..., a 1975 album by Ralph McTell
- Streets: A Rock Opera, a 1991 album by Savatage
- "Streets" (Doja Cat song), from the album Hot Pink (2019)
- "Streets", a song by Avenged Sevenfold from the album Sounding the Seventh Trumpet (2001)
- The Streets, alias of Mike Skinner, a British rapper
- "The Streets" (song) by WC featuring Snoop Dogg and Nate Dogg, from the album Ghetto Heisman (2002)

== Other uses ==
- Streets (film), a 1990 American thriller/drama film
- Streets (ice cream), an Australian ice cream brand owned by Unilever
- Streets (solitaire), a variant of the solitaire game Napoleon at St Helena
- Tai Streets (born 1977), American football player
- Will Streets (1886–1916), English soldier and poet of the First World War
- The Streets (performance art), by Abel Azcona

== See also ==
- Street (disambiguation)
