= Van Gogh's Chair =

Painting by Vincent van Gogh

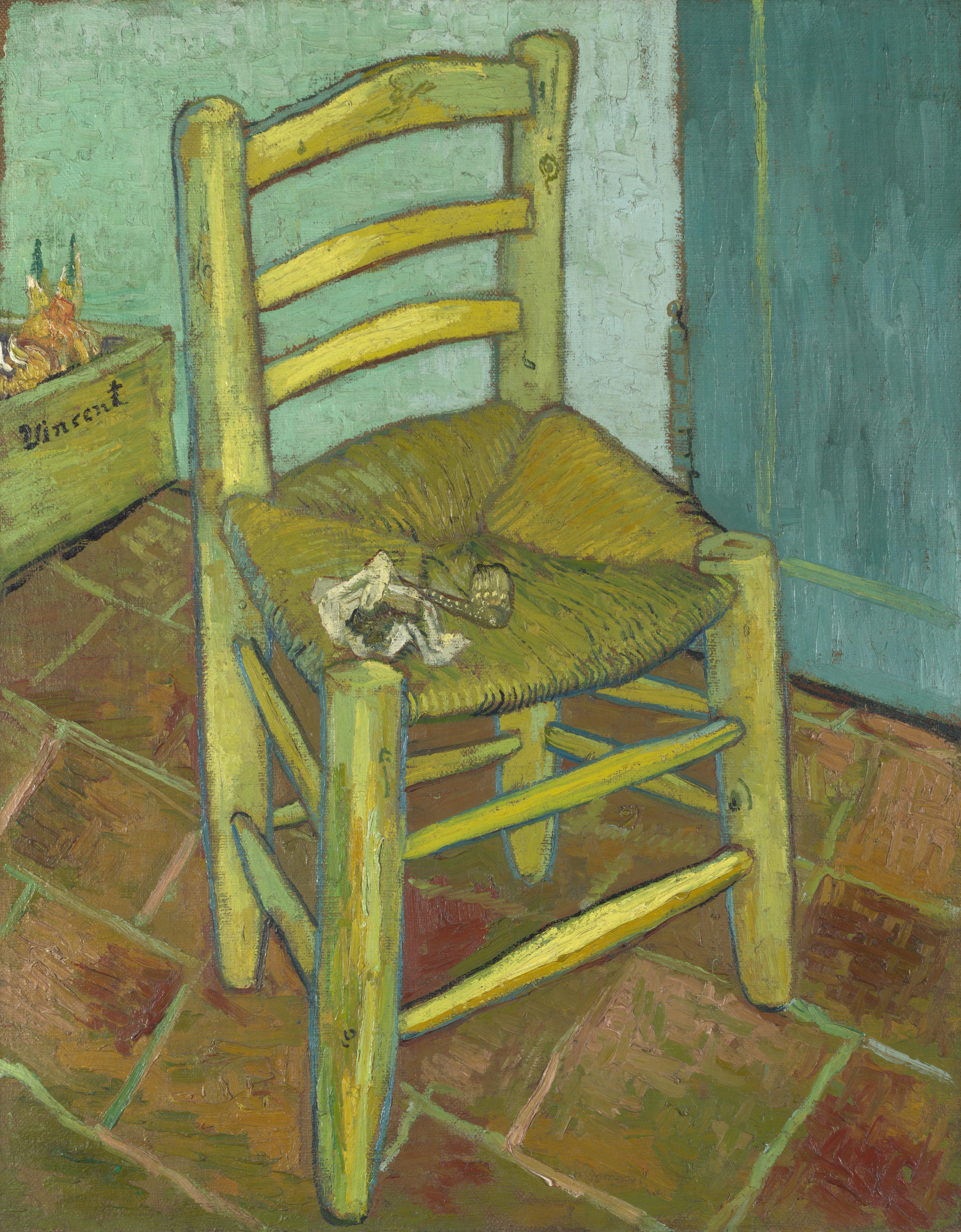
- Artist: Vincent van Gogh
- Year: 1888
- Catalogue: F498; JH1635
- Medium: Oil on canvas
- Dimensions: 93.0 cm × 73.5 cm (36.6 in × 28.9 in)
- Location: National Gallery; London

Van Gogh's Chair is a painting created in 1888 by Dutch artist Vincent van Gogh. It is currently held by the National Gallery, London.

The painting shows a rustic wooden chair, with a simple woven straw seat, on a tiled floor. On the chair seat is a decorated pipe and a pouch of pipe tobacco. In the background is an onion box with Vincent’s name on it. It has become one of Van Gogh's most iconic images, to the extent that Van Gogh's cataloger Jan Hulsker noted that "there are few pictures of Vincent's about which so much was written in later years."

== Background ==
On 7 May 1888 Van Gogh moved from the Hôtel Carrel to the Café de la Gare, at Arles, in the south of France. He had befriended the proprietors, Joseph and Marie Ginoux. The Yellow House, at 2 place Lamartine, had to be furnished before he could fully move in, but he was able to use it as a studio. He wanted a gallery to display his work, and started a series of paintings that eventually included Van Gogh's Chair (1888), Bedroom in Arles (1888), The Night Café (1888), Cafe Terrace at Night (September 1888), Starry Night Over the Rhone (1888), and Still Life: Vase with Twelve Sunflowers (1888), all intended for the decoration for the Yellow House.

The inspiration for the picture is stated to have originated with a picture the British newspaper The Graphic, published completed by Luke Fildes the day after novelist Charles Dickens' death in 1870, showing Dickens' empty chair in his study; this illustration was widely reprinted worldwide.

== Description ==
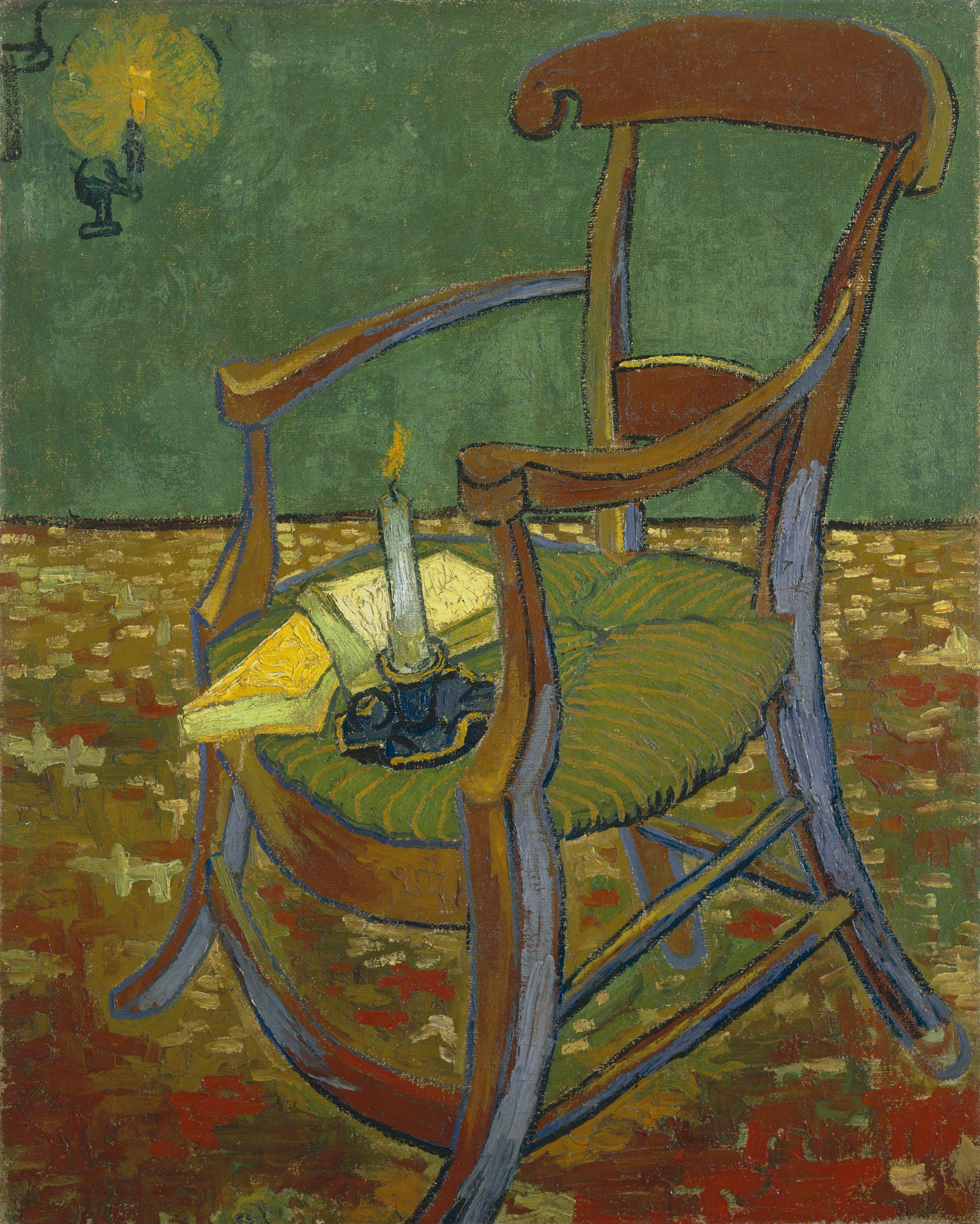
Paul Gauguin's Armchair, F499 JH1636, Van Gogh Museum, Amsterdam

Van Gogh's Chair is a product of the artist's tumultuous time spent with fellow painter Paul Gauguin. Both this work and its pendant piece Paul Gauguin's Armchair are painted in complementary colours, blue and orange for Van Gogh, red and green for Gauguin. The two paintings were painted before Van Gogh cut off his ear, but continued to be refined after he was hospitalised. Van Gogh set out to "in these two studies, as in others, I myself sought an effect of light with bright colour"

== Analysis ==
The contrasts between Van Gogh's Chair and Paul Gauguin's Armchair have led to much analysis of the symbolism of these two paintings. While Van Gogh's chair is simple and unpretentious, Gauguin's is far more lavish and ornate. This has been interpreted in light of Van Gogh and Gauguin's tempestuous relationship.

== See also ==
- List of works by Vincent van Gogh
- Décoration for the Yellow House

== Sources ==
- Callow, Philip (1990). Vincent van Gogh: A Life. Ivan R. Dee. ISBN 978-1-56663-134-1.
- Gayford, Martin (2006). The Yellow House: Van Gogh, Gauguin, and Nine Turbulent Weeks in Arles. Penguin. ISBN 978-0-670-91497-5.
- Hardy, William (1997). Van Gogh: The History and Techniques of the Great Masters. Eagle Editions. ISBN 978-0785807964.
- Hulsker, Jan (2006). The New Complete Van Gogh: Paintings, Drawings, Sketches. John Benjamins. ISBN 1556195133.
- Pickvance, Ronald (1984). "(exh. cat)". Van Gogh in Arles. Abrams. ISBN 978-0-87099-375-6. Metropolitan Museum of Art.
