= Streeter =

Streeter may refer to:

- Streeter, North Dakota, American city
- Streeter, West Virginia, American city
- Streeters Corners, New York, an unincorporated hamlet
- Streeter (surname)
- Streeter–Phelps equation, a water-modeling tool

== See also ==
- Streeterville, a waterfront neighborhood in Chicago, Illinois
  - Streeter Place, a residential building in Streeterville
- Streator, Illinois
