= The Street =

The Street may refer to:

== Geographical ==
- Wall Street in New York City's Financial District
- The Street, Lawshall, Suffolk, England
- The Street (Heath Charnock), a building and bridleway in Rivington, Lancashire, England

== Film and television ==
- The Street (British TV series), a drama shown on BBC One in 2006, 2007 and 2009
- The Street (2000 TV series), an American television drama series
- The Street: A Film with the Homeless, a 1997 documentary about the Canadian homeless in Montreal
- The Street (1988 TV series), an American police drama
- The Street (1923 film), a German silent drama film
- The Street (1949 film), as Swedish drama film
- The Street (1958 film), a German crime drama film
- The Street (1976 film), an Oscar-nominated animated short film by Caroline Leaf, adapted from the Mordechai Richler story
- The Street (2019 film), a documentary about gentrification in London

== Literature ==
- "The Street" (short story), by H. P. Lovecraft
- The Street (novel), a 1946 novel by Ann Petry
- The Street (story collection), a 1969 short story collection by Mordecai Richler

== Painting ==
- The Street, 1888 painting by Vincent van Gogh

== Website ==
- TheStreet.com, an American financial news and services website

== See also ==
- The Streets (aka Michael Geoffery Skinner, born 1978), a rapper from Birmingham, England
- La Rue (disambiguation), an equivalent disambiguation page with French wording
- La Strada, equivalent disambiguation page with Italian wording
