= The Streets (performance art) =

Performance art by Abel Azcona

- Artist: Abel Azcona
- Year: 2014
- Medium: Performance art
- Location: Bogotá, Madrid, Mexico City

The Streets is a conceptual and performative work of critical and biographical content by artist Abel Azcona. At the end of 2014 and the early part of 2015, Azcona explored the processual work La Calle ("the sexual exchange") this time in the Santa Fe locality of Bogotá, where he prostituted himself on the streets. In this new work, he explored a change towards the figure of his mother, taking hormones and engaging in prostitution. Azcona was inspired by his biological mother, a prostitute, and sought to empathise with her and with the moment of his own conception. The process continued in the cities of Madrid and Mexico City. The performance emerged, as with the rest of his sex-themed works, as an exercise in empathy with his own biological mother. It was also a social critique, where the artist explored the limits of his body by repeating patterns of sexual abuse, which occurred in his own childhood and in the life of his mother.

== See also ==
- Installation art
- Endurance art
- Drugs and prostitution

== Bibliography ==
- Peñuela, Jorge (2017). Anarchaegraphy of artistic thought (in Spanish). UD Creaciones. ISBN 978-9585434172.
- Moya Gómez, Carlos (2016). A vision of gender through performance in today's Spain (PDF) (in Spanish). Universitat Pompeu Fabra.
- Silva Gómez, Norma Ángelica (2018). Abel Azcona: Of empathy as (im) possibility (in Spanish). Colegio de Saberes de México.
- López Landabaso, Patricia (2017). La performance como medio de expresión artística. Expresiones actuales en el País Vasco (PDF) (in Spanish). Universidad del País Vasco.
- Cano Martínez, Maria Jesús (2018). Escondido tras la piel: representaciones y afrontamientos del dolor y el sufrimiento desde el arte de acción (in Spanish). Universidad de Granada. ISBN 9788491639541.
- Molina Ruiz, Irene (2016). El autorretrato como canalizador del dolor (in Spanish). University of Granada. ISBN 9788491258148.
