= The Night Café =

Painting by Vincent van Gogh

- Le Café de nuit (French)
- Artist: Vincent van Gogh
- Year: 1888
- Catalogue: F463; JH1575
- Medium: Oil on canvas
- Dimensions: 72.4 cm × 92.1 cm (28.5 in × 36.3 in)
- Location: Yale University Art Gallery, New Haven

The Night Café (French: Le Café de nuit) is an oil painting created by Dutch artist Vincent van Gogh in September 1888 in Arles. Its title is inscribed lower right beneath the signature. The painting is owned by Yale University and is currently held at the Yale University Art Gallery in New Haven, Connecticut.

The interior depicted is the Café de la Gare, 30 Place Lamartine, run by Joseph-Michel Ginoux and his wife Marie, who in November 1888 posed for Van Gogh's and Gauguin's Arlésienne; a bit later, Joseph Ginoux evidently posed for both artists, too.

== Description ==
The painting was executed on industrial primed canvas of size 30 (French standard). It depicts the interior of the cafe, with a half-curtained doorway in the center background leading, presumably, to more private quarters. Five customers sit at tables along the walls to the left and right, with Ginoux, the landlord said to be depicted (standing) in it, to one side of a billiard table near the center of the room, facing the viewer.

The five customers depicted in the scene have been described as "three drunks and derelicts in a large public room [...] huddled down in sleep or stupor." One scholar wrote, "The cafe was an all-night haunt of local down-and-outs and prostitutes, who are depicted slouched at tables and drinking together at the far end of the room."

In wildly contrasting, vivid colours, the ceiling is green, the upper walls red, the glowing, gas ceiling lamps and floor largely yellow. The paint is applied thickly, with many of the lines of the room leading toward the door in the back. The perspective looks somewhat downward toward the floor.

== Genesis ==
Watercolor version, Hahnloser collection

In a jocular passage of a letter van Gogh wrote to his brother, Theo, the artist said Ginoux had taken so much of his money that he'd told the cafe owner it was time to take his revenge by painting the place.

In August 1888, the artist told his brother in a letter:

Today I am probably going to begin on the interior of the café where I have a room, by gas light, in the evening. It is what they call here a “café de nuit” (they are fairly frequent here), staying open all night. “Night prowlers” can take refuge there when they have no money to pay for a lodging, or are too drunk to be taken in.

In the first days of September 1888, van Gogh sat up for three consecutive nights to paint the picture, sleeping during the day.

Van Gogh's Cafe Terrace at Night, showing outdoor tables, a street scene and the night sky, was painted in Arles at about the same time. It depicts a different cafe, a larger establishment on the Place du Forum.

== Critical reaction ==
=== Van Gogh on the painting ===
Van Gogh wrote many letters to his brother, Theo van Gogh, and often included details of his latest work. The artist wrote his brother more than once about The Night Café. According to Meyer Schapiro, "there are few works on which [Van Gogh] has written with more conviction."

In one of the letters he describes this painting:

I have tried to express the terrible passions of humanity by means of red and green. The room is blood red and dark yellow with a green billiard table in the middle; there are four lemon-yellow lamps with a glow of orange and green. Everywhere there is a clash and contrast of the most alien reds and greens, in the figures of little sleeping hooligans, in the empty dreary room, in violet and blue. The blood-red and the yellow-green of the billiard table, for instance, contrast with the soft tender Louis XV green of the counter, on which there is a rose nosegay. The white clothes of the landlord, watchful in a corner of that furnace, turn lemon-yellow, or pale luminous green.

The next day (September 9), he wrote Theo: "In my picture of the Night Café I have tried to express the idea that the café is a place where one can ruin oneself, go mad or commit a crime. So I have tried to express, as it were, the powers of darkness in a low public house, by soft Louis XV green and malachite, contrasting with yellow-green and harsh blue-greens, and all this in an atmosphere like a devil's furnace, of pale sulphur. And all with an appearance of Japanese gaiety, and the good nature of Tartarin."

He also wrote: "It is color not locally true from the point of view of the stereoscopic realist, but color to suggest the emotion of an ardent temperament."

The violent exaggeration of the colours and the thick texture of the paint made the picture "one of the ugliest pictures I have done", Van Gogh wrote at one point. He also called it "the equivalent, though different, of The Potato Eaters", which it resembles somewhat in its use of lamplight and concerns for the condition of people in need.

Soon after its execution, Van Gogh incorporated this painting into his Décoration for the Yellow House.

=== Reaction of critics and scholars ===
The work has been called one of Van Gogh's masterpieces and one of his most famous.

Unlike typical Impressionist works, the painter does not project a neutral stance towards the world or an attitude of enjoyment of the beauty of nature or of the moment. The painting is an instance of Van Gogh's use of what he called "suggestive colour" or, as he would soon term it, "arbitrary colour" in which the artist infused his works with his emotions, typical of what was later called Expressionism.

The red and green of the walls and ceiling are an "oppressive combination", and the lamps are "sinister features" with orange-and-green halos, according to Nathaniel Harris. "The top half of the canvas creates its basic mood, as any viewer can verify by looking at it with one or the other half of the reproduction covered up; the bottom half supplies the 'facts.'" The thick paint adds a surreal touch of waviness to the table tops, billiard table and floor. The viewer is left with a feeling of seediness and despair, Harris wrote. "The scene might easily be banal and dispiriting; instead, it is dispiriting but also terrible."

The objects of pleasure (billiard table, wine bottles and glasses) are contrasted in the picture with the "few human beings absorbed in their individual loneliness and despair", Antonia Lant commented.

The perspective of the scene is one of its most powerful effects, according to various critics. Schapiro described the painting's "absorbing perspective which draws us headlong past empty chairs and tables into hidden depths behind a distant doorway — an opening like the silhouette of the standing figure." Lant described it as a "shocking perspectival rush, which draws us, by the converging diagonals of floorboards and billiard table, towards the mysterious, courtained doorway beyond." Harris wrote that the perspective "pitches the viewer forward into the room, towards the half-curtained private quarters, and also creates a sense of vertigo and distorted vision, familiar from nightmares." Schapiro also noted, "To the impulsive rush of these converging lines he opposes the broad horizontal band of red, full of scattered objects [...]"

== Gauguin's painting of Marie Ginoux in the Café de la Gare ==
Gauguin's Night Café at Arles

Soon after his arrival in Arles, Paul Gauguin painted the same location, as a background to his portrait of Madame Ginoux. While the Van Gogh painting depicts the café as a room of isolation, Gauguin's Night Café at Arles mixes the concepts of isolation (to the painting's left) and spirited socializing (in the center), behind Madame Ginoux.

It was acquired by Ivan Morozov and now hangs in the Pushkin Museum of Fine Arts.

== History ==
Van Gogh used the picture to settle debts with Ginoux, the landlord said to be depicted (standing) in it. Formerly a highlight of the Ivan Morozov collection in Moscow, the painting was nationalized and sold by the Soviet authorities in the 1930s. The painting was eventually acquired by Stephen Carlton Clark, who bequeathed it to the art gallery of Yale University.

On March 24, 2009, Yale sued Pierre Konowaloff, Morozov's purported great-grandson, to maintain the university's title to the work. Konowaloff had allegedly asserted a claim to own the painting on the grounds that the Soviets had invalidly nationalized it. Yale dropped its lawsuit in October of that year, in a motion which stated "it is well-established that a foreign nation's taking of its own national's property within its own borders does not violate international law", claiming that both the Soviet and Yale acquisitions of the painting were therefore legal.

On March 27, 2016, the United States Supreme Court rejected an appeal by Konowaloff regarding the case, siding with a federal appeals court in New York cited the "act of state" doctrine. The rejection means Yale's ownership is absolute.

== Namesake ==
The Night Café, a British indie pop band formed in 2014, is named after the painting.

== See also ==
- List of works by Vincent van Gogh
- Soviet sale of Hermitage paintings
