= Mean Streets (disambiguation) =

Mean Streets is a 1973 drama film directed by Martin Scorsese.

Mean Streets or Mean Street may also refer to:

== Literature ==
- Mean Streets (anthology), 2009 anthology of science fiction and fantasy stories
- Mean Streets (Dicks novel), a 1997 original novel by Terrance Dicks

== Games ==
- Mean Streets (video game), a 1989 dystopian cyberpunk noir adventure game

== Music ==
- "Mean Street", a song by Van Halen from their album Fair Warning
- Mean Streets – No Bridges, a 1987 album by jazz guitarist Jimmy Ponder
