= Street people (disambiguation) =

Street people are people who live a public life on the streets of a city.

Street people may also refer to:

- Street People (film), a 1976 Italian film starring Roger Moore
- The Street People, an American R&B/disco group from 1974
- Ronnie Hudson and the Street People, known for "West Coast Poplock" (1982)
- Street People, a band of Rupert Holmes, who recorded "Jennifer Tomkins" (1969)
