= French standard sizes for oil paintings =

Standard for sizes of canvases

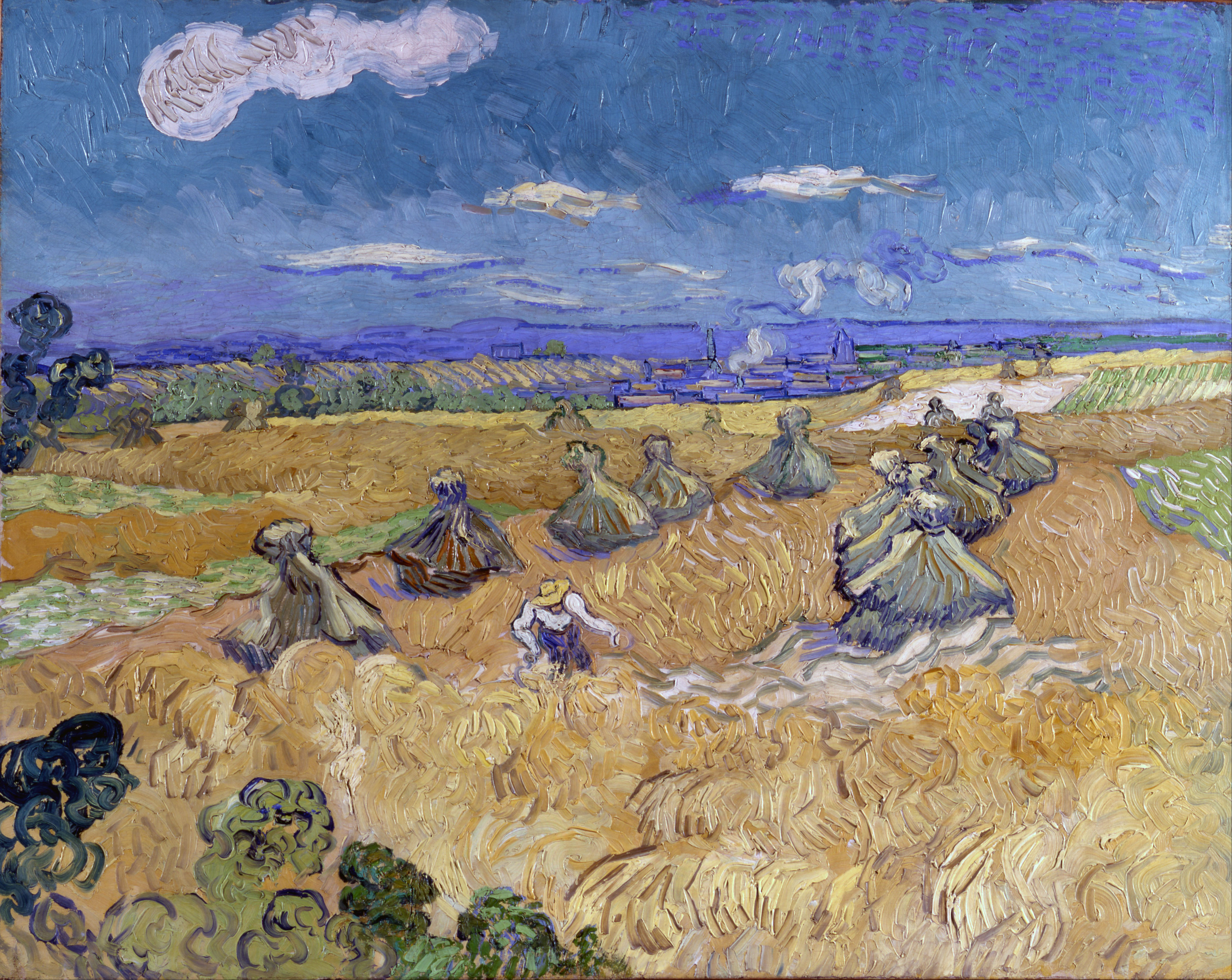
Harvest near Auvers (1890), a size 30 canvas, by Vincent van Gogh.

French standard sizes for oil paintings refers to a series of different sized canvases for use by artists. The sizes were fixed in the 19th century. Most artists—not only French—used this standard, as it was supported by the main suppliers of artist materials. Only some contemporary artist material suppliers continue to use these standards today, as most artists no longer differentiate canvas sizes by subject.

The main separation from size 0 (toile de 0) to size 120 (toile de 120) is divided in separate runs for faces/portraits (figure), landscapes (paysage), and marines (marine) which more or less keep the diagonal. That is, a figure 0 corresponds in height to a paysage 1 and a marine 2. In modern times in the USA size is usually stated height by width, where as in this article it is width by height.

Numéro	Figure (cm)	Paysage (cm)	Marine (cm)
0	18 × 14	18 × 12	18 × 10
1	22 × 16	22 × 14	22 × 12
2	24 × 19	24 × 16	24 × 14
3	27 × 22	27 × 19	27 × 16
4	33 × 24	33 × 22	33 × 19
5	35 × 27	35 × 24	35 × 22
6	41 × 33	41 × 27	41 × 24
8	46 × 38	46 × 33	46 × 27
10	55 × 46	55 × 38	55 × 33
12	61 × 50	61 × 46	61 × 38
15	65 × 54	65 × 50	65 × 46
20	73 × 60	73 × 54	73 × 50
25	81 × 65	81 × 60	81 × 54
30	92 × 73	92 × 65	92 × 60
40	100 × 81	100 × 73	100 × 65
50	116 × 89	116 × 81	116 × 73
60	130 × 97	130 × 89	130 × 81
80	146 × 114	146 × 97	146 × 89
100	162 × 130	162 × 114	162 × 97
120	195 × 130	195 × 114	195 × 97
