= The Yellow House =

Painting by Vincent van Gogh

- Het gele huis (Dutch)
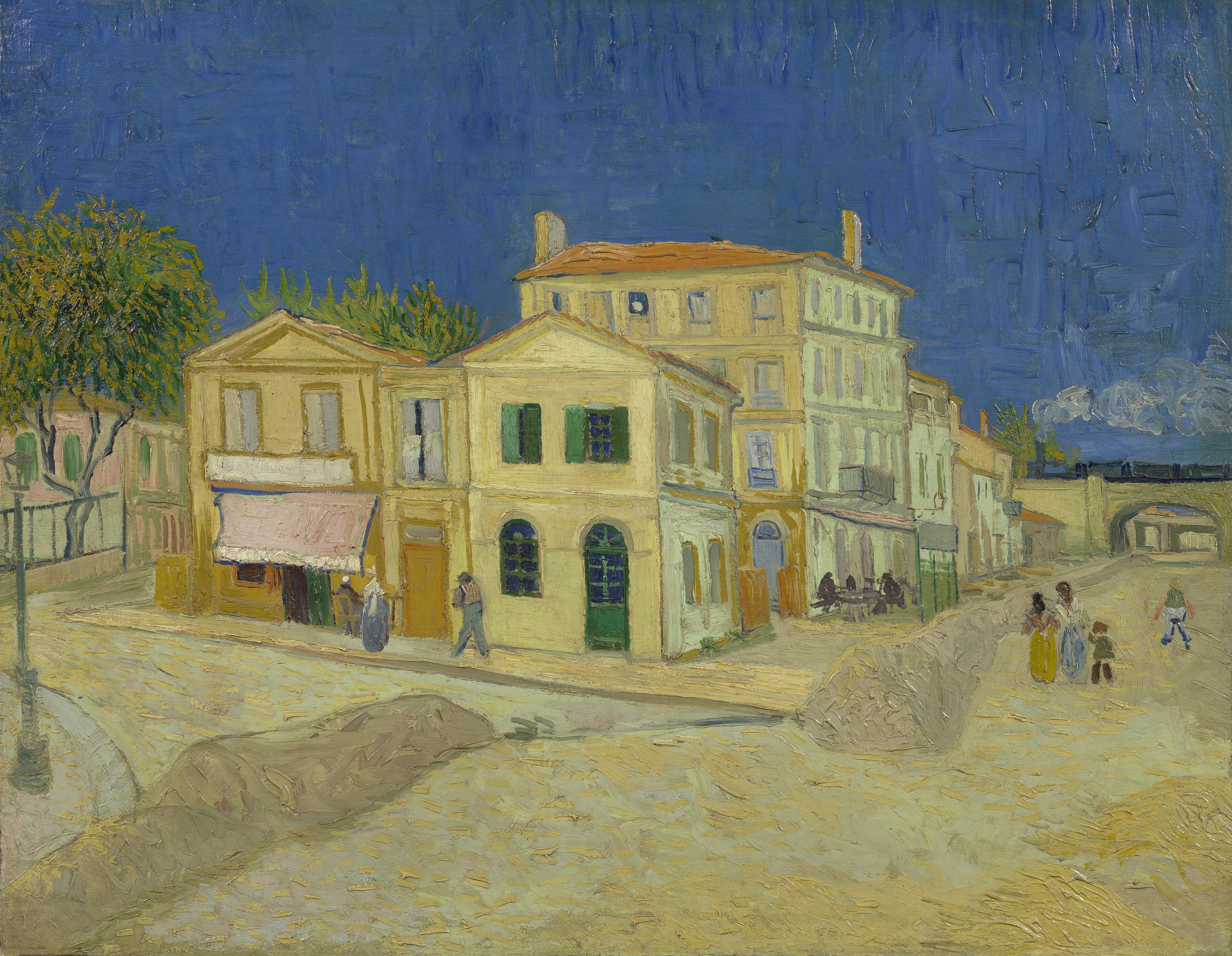
- Artist: Vincent van Gogh
- Year: 1888
- Catalogue: F464; JH1589
- Medium: Oil on canvas
- Dimensions: 76 cm × 94 cm (28.3 in × 36 in)
- Location: Van Gogh Museum; Amsterdam

The Yellow House (Dutch: Het gele huis), alternatively named The Street (Dutch: De straat), is an 1888 oil painting by the 19th-century Dutch Post-Impressionist painter Vincent van Gogh.

The house was the right wing of 2 Place Lamartine, Arles, France, where, on May 1, 1888, Van Gogh rented four rooms. He occupied two large ones on the ground floor to serve as an atelier (workshop) and kitchen, and on the first floor, two smaller ones facing Place Lamartine. The window on the first floor nearest the corner with both shutters open is that of Van Gogh's guest room, where Paul Gauguin lived for nine weeks from late October 1888. Behind the next window, with shutters nearly closed, is Van Gogh's bedroom. The two small rooms at the rear were rented by Van Gogh at a later time.

Van Gogh indicated that the restaurant where he used to have his meals was in the building painted pink, close to the left edge of the painting (28 Place Lamartine). It was run by Widow Venissac, who was also Van Gogh's landlady, and who owned several of the other buildings depicted. To the right of the Yellow House, the Avenue Montmajour runs down to the two railway bridges. The first line (with a train just passing) served the local connection to Lunel, which is on the opposite (that is, right) bank of river Rhône. The other line was owned by the P.-L.-M. Railway Company (Paris Lyon Méditerranée). In the left foreground is an indication of the corner of the pedestrian walk which surrounded one of the public gardens on Place Lamartine. The ditch running up Avenue Montmajour from the left towards the bridges served the gas pipe, which allowed van Gogh a little later to have gaslight installed in his atelier.

The building was severely damaged in a bombing raid by the Allies on June 25, 1944, and was later demolished.

== Genesis ==
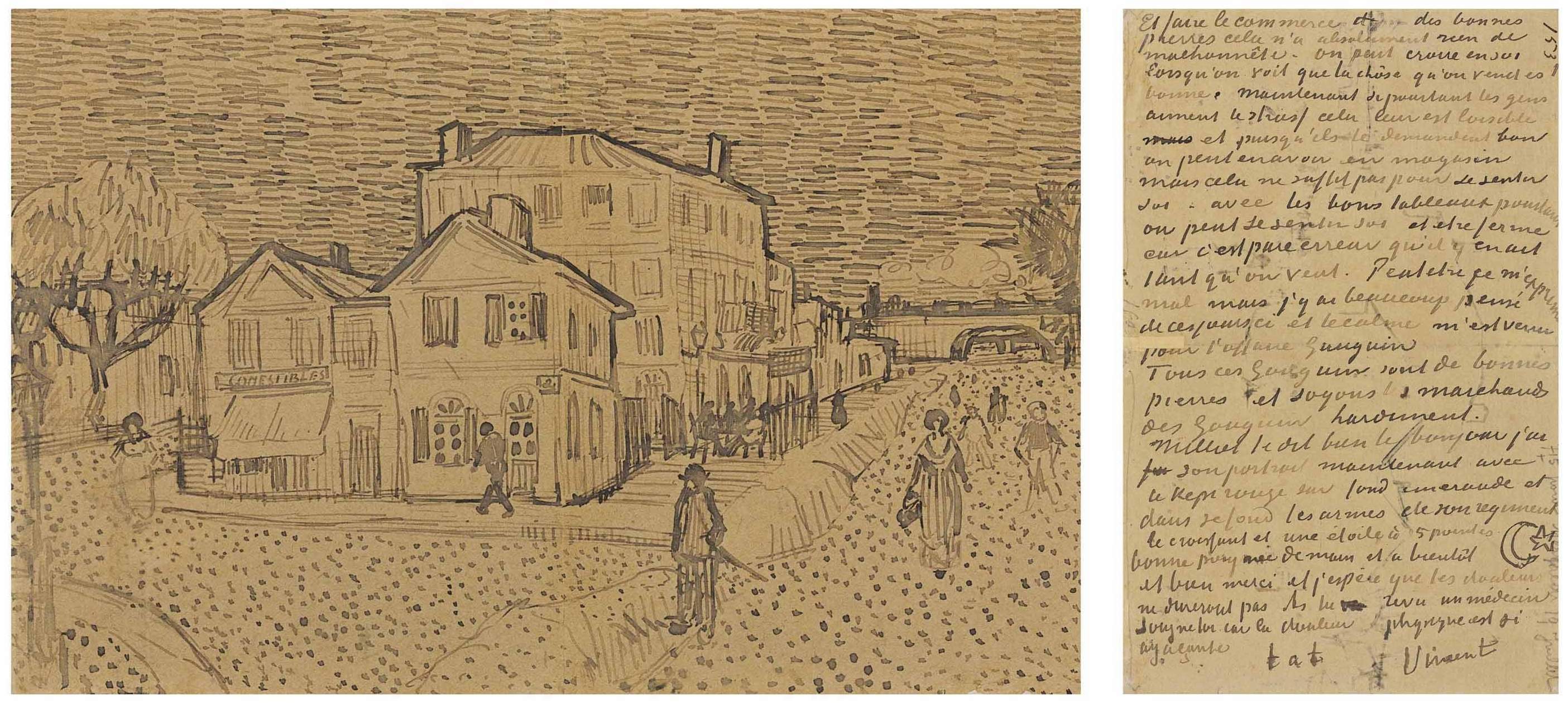
Vincent van Gogh – Letter VGM 491 – The Yellow House F1453 JH 1590

The painting was executed in September 1888, at which time Van Gogh sent a sketch of the composition to his brother Theo:

Also a sketch of a 30 square canvas representing the house and its setting under a sulphur sun under a pure cobalt sky. The theme is a hard one! But that is exactly why I want to conquer it. Because it is fantastic, these yellow houses in the sun and also the incomparable freshness of the blue. All the ground is yellow too. I will soon send you a better drawing of it than this sketch out of my head.

The house on the left is yellow with green shutters. It's the one that is shaded by a tree. This is the restaurant where I go to dine every day. My friend the factor is at the end of the street on the left, between the two bridges of the railroad. The night café that I painted is not in the picture, it is on the left of the restaurant.

Milliet finds this horrible, but I don't need to tell you that when he says he doesn't understand that one can have fun doing a common grocer's shop and the stiff and proper houses without any grace, but I remember that Zola did a certain boulevard in the beginning of L'assommoir, and Flaubert a corner of the embankment of the Villette in the dog days in the beginning of Bouvard and Pécuchet which are not to be sneezed at.

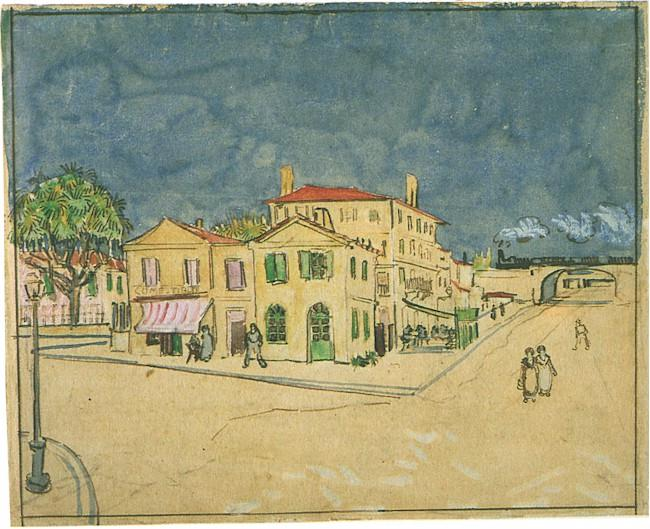
Watercolour by Van Gogh, executed after the painting

Initially, Van Gogh titled the painting as The House and its environment (French: La Maison et son entourage). Later he opted for a more meaningful title and called it The Street (French: La Rue), paying homage to a suite of sketches showing streets in Paris, by Jean-François Raffaëlli, and recently published in Le Figaro.

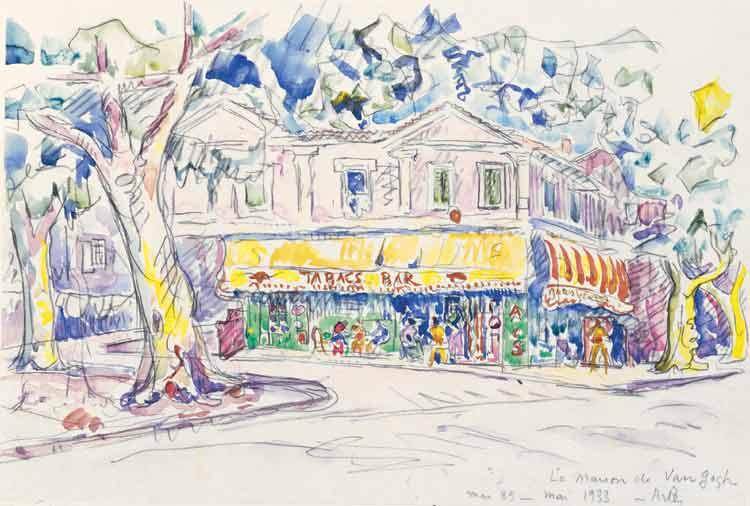
Paul Signac: The House of Van Gogh, 1932. Watercolour, private collection.

== Pedigree ==
This painting never left the artist's estate. Since 1962, it has been in the possession of the Vincent van Gogh Foundation, established by Vincent Willem van Gogh, the artist's nephew, and on permanent loan to the Van Gogh Museum, Amsterdam.

=== Since the 1940s ===
The Yellow House itself no longer exists. It was severely damaged in bombing-raids during the Second World War, and later demolished. The place without the house looks almost the same. A placard on the scene commemorates its former existence.

== See also ==
- List of works by Vincent van Gogh

== Resources ==
=== References ===
- Dorn, Roland: Décoration: Vincent van Gogh's Werkreihe für das Gelbe Haus in Arles, Georg Olms Verlag, Hildesheim, Zürich & New York 1990 ISBN 3-487-09098-8 / ISSN 0175-9558
