= Café Terrace at Night =

1888 painting by Vincent van Gogh

Coordinates: 43°40′39″N 4°37′38″E

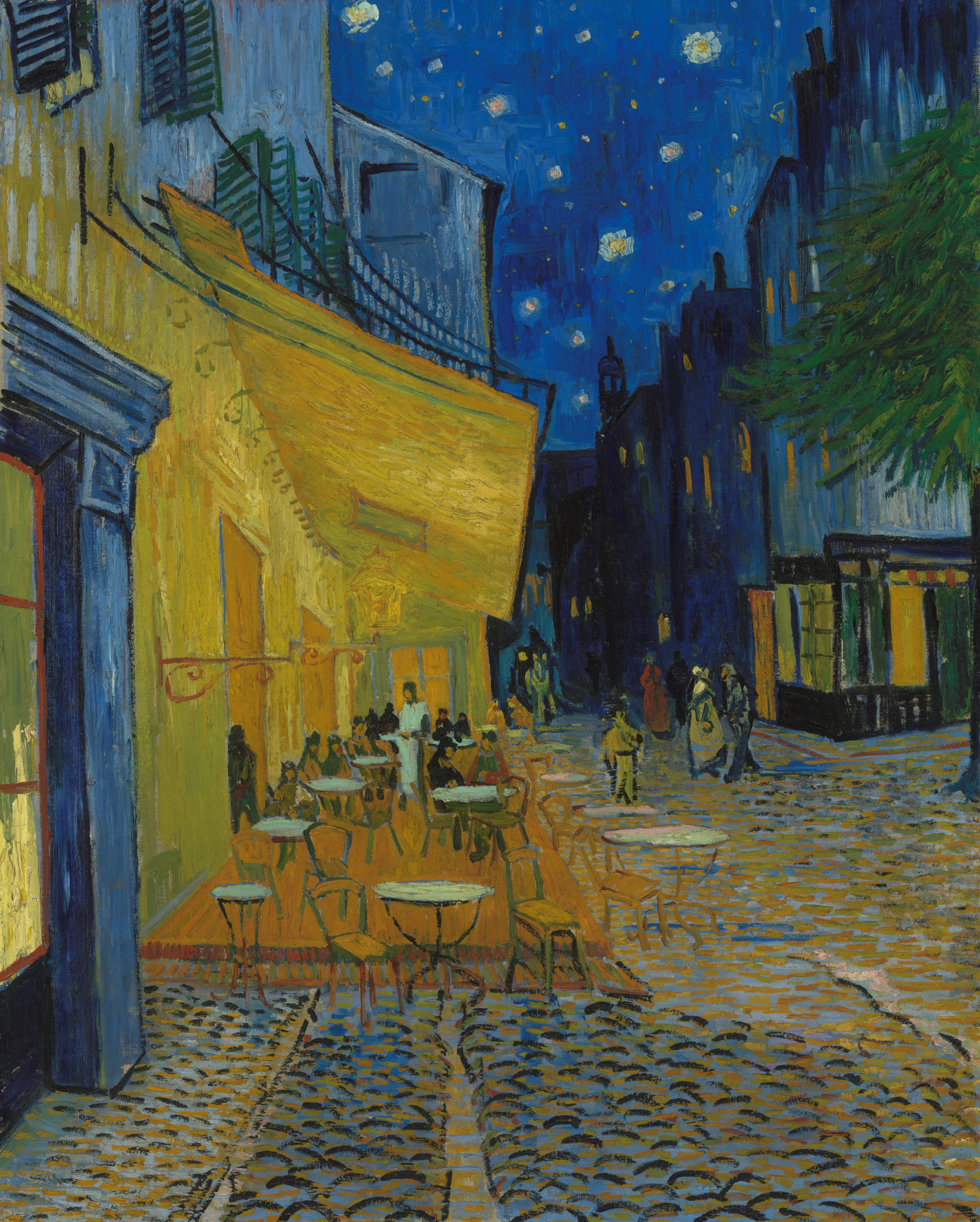
- Artist: Vincent van Gogh
- Year: September 1888
- Catalogue: F467; JH1580
- Medium: Oil on canvas
- Dimensions: 80.7 cm × 65.3 cm (31.8 in × 25.7 in)
- Location: Kröller-Müller Museum, Otterlo

Café Terrace at Night is an 1888 oil painting by the Dutch artist Vincent van Gogh. It is also known as The Cafe Terrace on the Place du Forum, and, when first exhibited in 1891, was entitled Coffeehouse, in the evening (Café, le soir).

Van Gogh painted Café Terrace at Night in Arles, France, in mid-September 1888. The painting is not signed, but described and mentioned by the artist in three letters.

Visitors to the site can stand at the north eastern corner of the Place du Forum, where the artist set up his easel. The site was refurbished in 1990 and 1991 to replicate van Gogh's painting. He looked south towards the artificially lit terrace of the popular coffee house, as well as into the enforced darkness of the rue du Palais which led up to a building structure (to the left, not pictured) and, beyond this structure, the tower of a former church which is now Musée Lapidaire.

Towards the right, Van Gogh indicated a lighted shop and some branches of the trees surrounding the place, but he omitted the remainders of the Roman monuments just beside this little shop.

The painting is currently at the Kröller-Müller Museum in Otterlo, Netherlands.

== Genesis ==
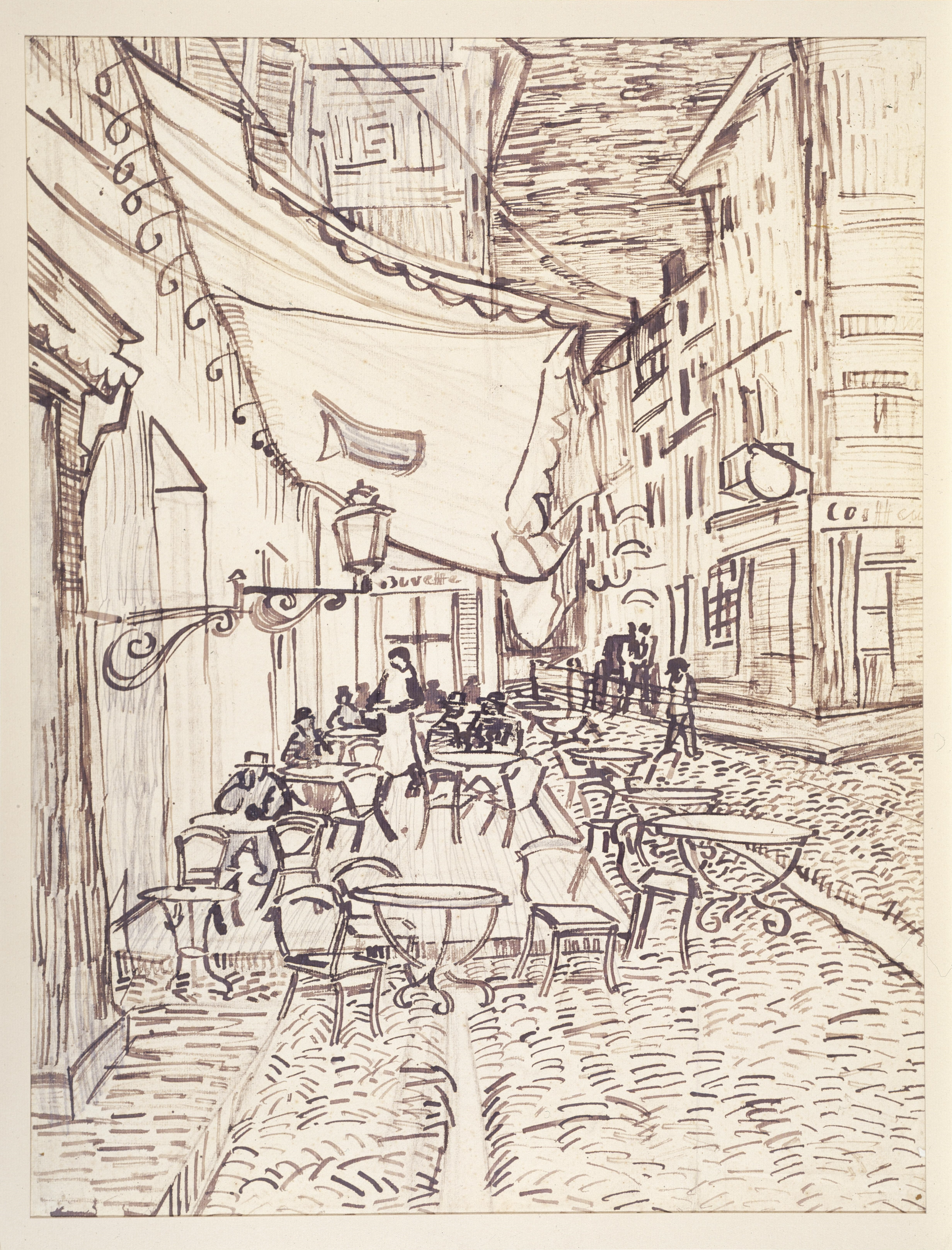
Preparatory study for the painting, September 1888. (F1519) Dallas Museum of Art, The Wendy and Emery Reves Collection.

After finishing Café Terrace at Night, Van Gogh wrote a letter to his sister expressing his enthusiasm:

I was interrupted precisely by the work that a new painting of the outside of a café in the evening has been giving me these past few days. On the terrace, there are little figures of people drinking. A huge yellow lantern lights the terrace, the façade, the pavement, and even projects light over the cobblestones of the street, which takes on a violet-pink tinge. The gables of the houses on a street that leads away under the blue sky studded with stars are dark blue or violet, with a green tree. Now there's a painting of night without black. With nothing but beautiful blue, violet and green, and in these surroundings the lighted square is coloured pale sulphur, lemon green. I enormously enjoy painting on the spot at night. In the past they used to draw, and paint the picture from the drawing in the daytime. But I find that it suits me to paint the thing straightaway. It's quite true that I may take a blue for a green in the dark, a blue lilac for a pink lilac, since you can’t make out the nature of the tone clearly. But it’s the only way of getting away from the conventional black night with a poor, pallid and whitish light, while in fact a mere candle by itself gives us the richest yellows and oranges.

He continues, in this same letter,

You never told me if you had read Guy de Maupassant’s Bel-ami, and what you now think of his talent in general. I say this because the beginning of Bel-ami is precisely the description of a starry night in Paris, with the lighted cafés of the boulevard, and it’s something like the same subject that I've painted just now.

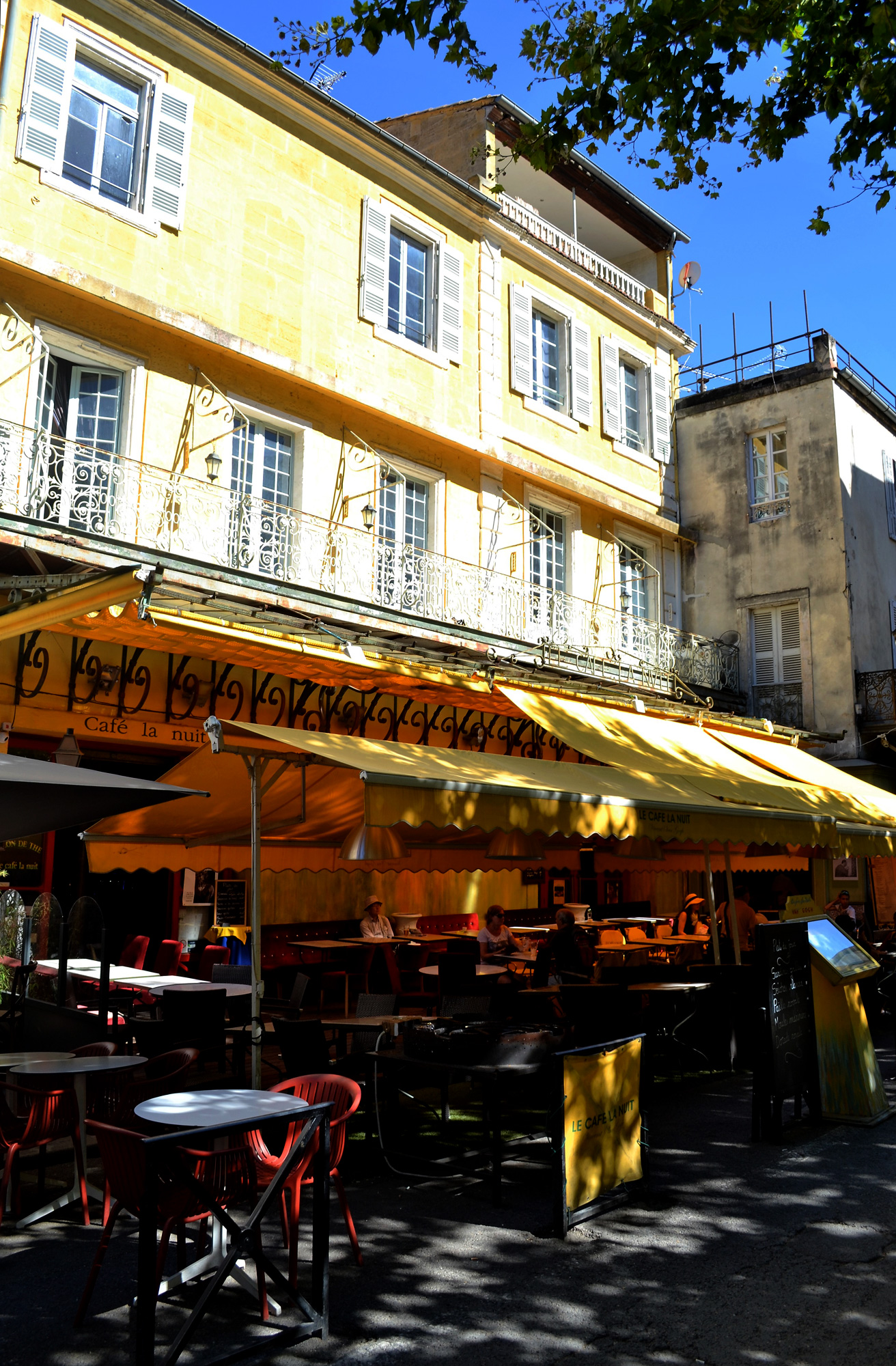
The café terrace, now 'Le Café La Nuit', at Place du Forum, Arles, July 2016

This excerpt forms the basis of the Van Gogh Museum's curators' opinion that the painting is a depiction "of drinkers in the harsh, bright lights of their illuminated facades" from Maupassant's novel Bel Ami, however, they also note that Maupassant makes no mention of a 'starry sky.' In 1981, Bogomila Welsh-Ovcharov argued that since it "displays not only a night scene but also a funnel-like perspective and dominant blue-yellow tonality" it was at least partially inspired by Louis Anquetin's Avenue de Clichy: 5 o'clock in the evening.

An academic paper presented at IAFOR's 2013 European Conference on Arts & Humanities, however, advanced the theory that van Gogh intended the painting to be a uniquely innovated Last Supper. The paper was subsequently published by The Art Histories Society in the January 2014 Art History Supplement and the July 2014 fourteenth volume of The Anistoriton Journal of History, Archaeology and Art History.

Briefly, the paper examines the myriad artistic influences van Gogh was parsing the summer of 1888: his lifelong devotion to and imitation of Jesus Christ; synthesizing Japonism and Cloisonnism with his own plein air techniques; colorizing Jean-François Millet's pious genre scenes with Eugène Delacroix's luminous palette (see Boats du Rhône); "search-for-sacred-realism" correspondence with his artist friend Émile Bernard; Thomas Carlyle and Boccaccio's examples of dressing old ideas in new clothes; an Émile Burnouf article claiming Buddhist missionaries sowed the seeds Essenes later reaped as Christianity; failed attempts creating his own Christ in the Garden of Olives; two proximal Last Supper studies (Interior of a Restaurant in Arles and Interior of the Restaurant Carrel in Arles) featuring straw-bottomed chairs he'd just purchased by the dozen (hoping to start a commune of twelve "artist-apostles" at his Yellow House); culminating with his composition of twelve diners drenched in a yellow halo surrounding a Rembrandtesque server framed by a crucifix at the vanishing point of the picture; it's concluded his original starry night is a Symbolist's Last Supper.

Although van Gogh never explicitly mentioned his intent in any existing letter, he did write his brother Theo two weeks later, "That doesn't stop me having a terrible need for - dare I say the word - for religion. So I go outside at night to paint the stars and I always dream a painting like that with a group of living figures of the pals."

== Night effects ==
When exhibited for the first time, in 1891, the painting was entitled Coffeehouse, in the evening (Café, le soir).

This is the first painting in which he used starry backgrounds; he went on to paint star-filled skies in Starry Night Over the Rhône (painted the same month), and the better known The Starry Night a year later. Van Gogh also painted a starlight background in Portrait of Eugène Boch. Van Gogh mentioned the Cafe Terrace painting in a letter written to Eugène Boch on 2 October 1888, writing he had painted "a view of the café on place du Forum, where we used to go, painted at night" (emphasis van Gogh's).

Unlike the subsequent case of the misplaced Ursa Major in Starry Night Over the Rhône, Van Gogh was careful to reflect the actual appearance of his sky in this work, and the position of the constellation Aquarius allowed Albert Boime to date the painting to early September 1888, at about 11:00 PM.

== In popular culture ==
The painting and the café were both featured in the 1956 film Lust for Life starring Kirk Douglas and later in "Vincent and the Doctor" (2010), the tenth episode in the fifth series of British science fiction television series Doctor Who, and in the fully painted film Loving Vincent (2017). The café was also featured in the film Ronin (1998).

The 1980 BBC series 100 Great Paintings featured the painting.

== Colour ==
"This is a night painting without black, with nothing but beautiful blue and violet and green and in this surrounding the illuminated area colors itself sulfur pale yellow and citron green."

== See also ==
- List of works by Vincent van Gogh
