= Interior of a Restaurant in Arles =

Painting by Vincent van Gogh

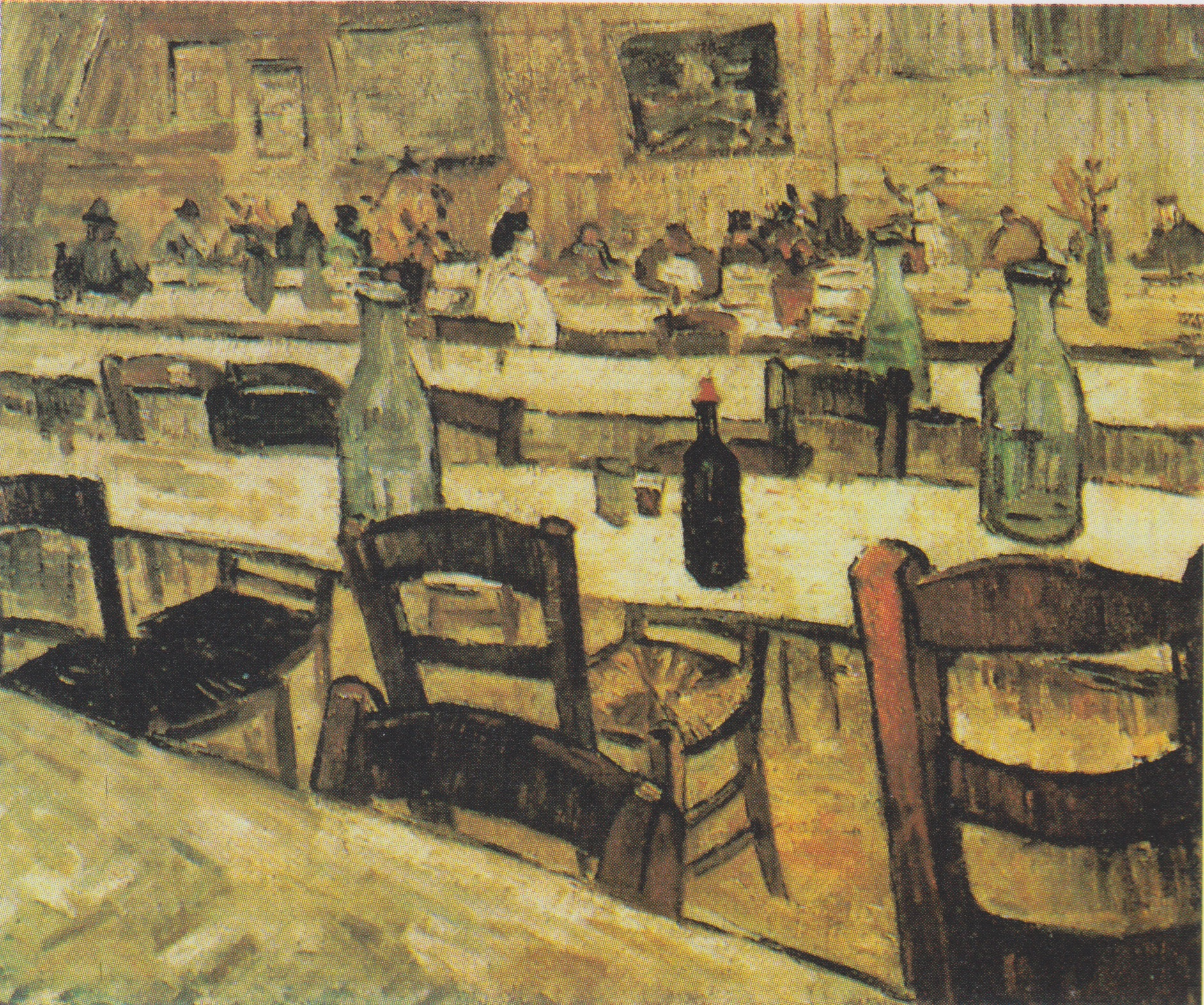
- Artist: Vincent van Gogh
- Year: 1888
- Catalogue: F549a JH1573
- Medium: Oil on canvas
- Dimensions: 65.5 cm × 81.0 cm (25.8 in × 31.9 in)
- Location: Private collection

Interior of the Restaurant Carrel in Arles
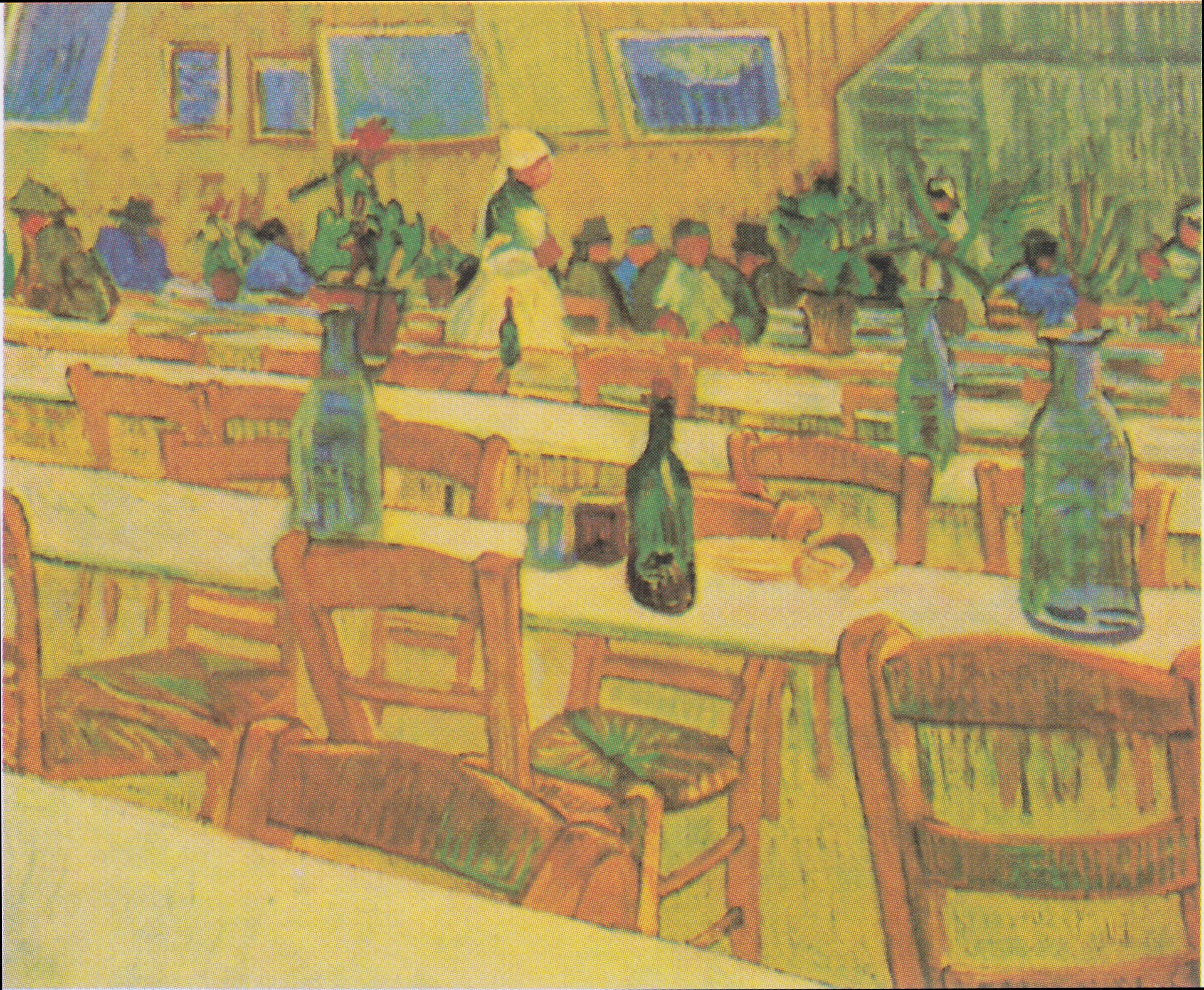
- Artist: Vincent van Gogh
- Year: 1888
- Catalogue: F549 JH1572
- Medium: Oil on canvas
- Dimensions: 54.0 cm × 64.5 cm (21.3 in × 25.4 in)
- Location: Private collection

Interior of a Restaurant in Arles is a colored oil painting by Dutch artist Vincent van Gogh on an industrially primed canvas of size 25 (Toile de 25 figure) in Arles, France, late August, 1888.

Accurately dating Interior of a Restaurant in Arles has been difficult, largely because van Gogh never mentioned it in any existing letter. Pierre Leprohon placed it in late August, 1888, due in part to the blossoming sunflowers; this has been generally accepted by authorities such as 20th century van Gogh scholar Jan Hulsker. It is one of two studies van Gogh created of the restaurant, the other being Interior of the Restaurant Carrel in Arles. Long assumed to be a view from inside the Hotel Carrel, de la Faille remarks they were probably the interior of the restaurant next to the Yellow House.

== Genesis ==
While certainly a representation of diners in Arles (regardless of the cafe), in his article Van Gogh's Last Supper: Transforming "the guise of observable reality," Baxter argues this is van Gogh's initial attempt in creating a Symbolist or sacred realism Last Supper:

There are a number of similarities between this painting and Renaissance Last Suppers. In the center is a serving figure. Most of the diners are stretched along the far side of the table. Three wine carafes feature prominently in the foreground. Admittedly, not much, but it is a start ...

Although Hulsker argued that determining whether this or its sister painting came first would be speculation, (Note: Hulsker did not believe JH1572 was a preliminary sketch for JH1573 and suggested that Vincent made two near identical copies because one was intended for the owner of the cafe.) Baxter offers the following argument: the second version is painted in a Cloisonnist style, giving it a stained glass window effect, a suitable medium for a Last Supper painting; and van Gogh has made a number of changes to the final version, most notably: adding bread and placing a new wine bottle before the central serving figure, giving it emphasis. Furthermore, van Gogh added more diners, including the figure hiding behind, what was once a vase of flowers, now appears to be a palm frond. Also, the flower arrangement on the left now resembles the top of a poll axe and is at about the same position where Simon Peter wields a blade in Leonardo da Vinci's version. But most importantly, right next to it, van Gogh has replicated Leonardo's leaning image of the apostle John, van Gogh's favorite.

Finally, van Gogh has enframed a female serving figure within vases of flowers, a motif he would return to months later with his Berceuse triptych. And lastly, all the empty chairs, which can be immediately recognizable from Vincent’s Chair, also his Bedroom in Arles, and he'd just bought twelve to furnish the Yellow House literally hours before beginning his final Symbolist's Last Supper Café Terrace at Night

== See also ==
- List of works by Vincent van Gogh
