= Starry Night Over the Rhône =

1888 painting by Vincent van Gogh

- La Nuit étoilée (French)
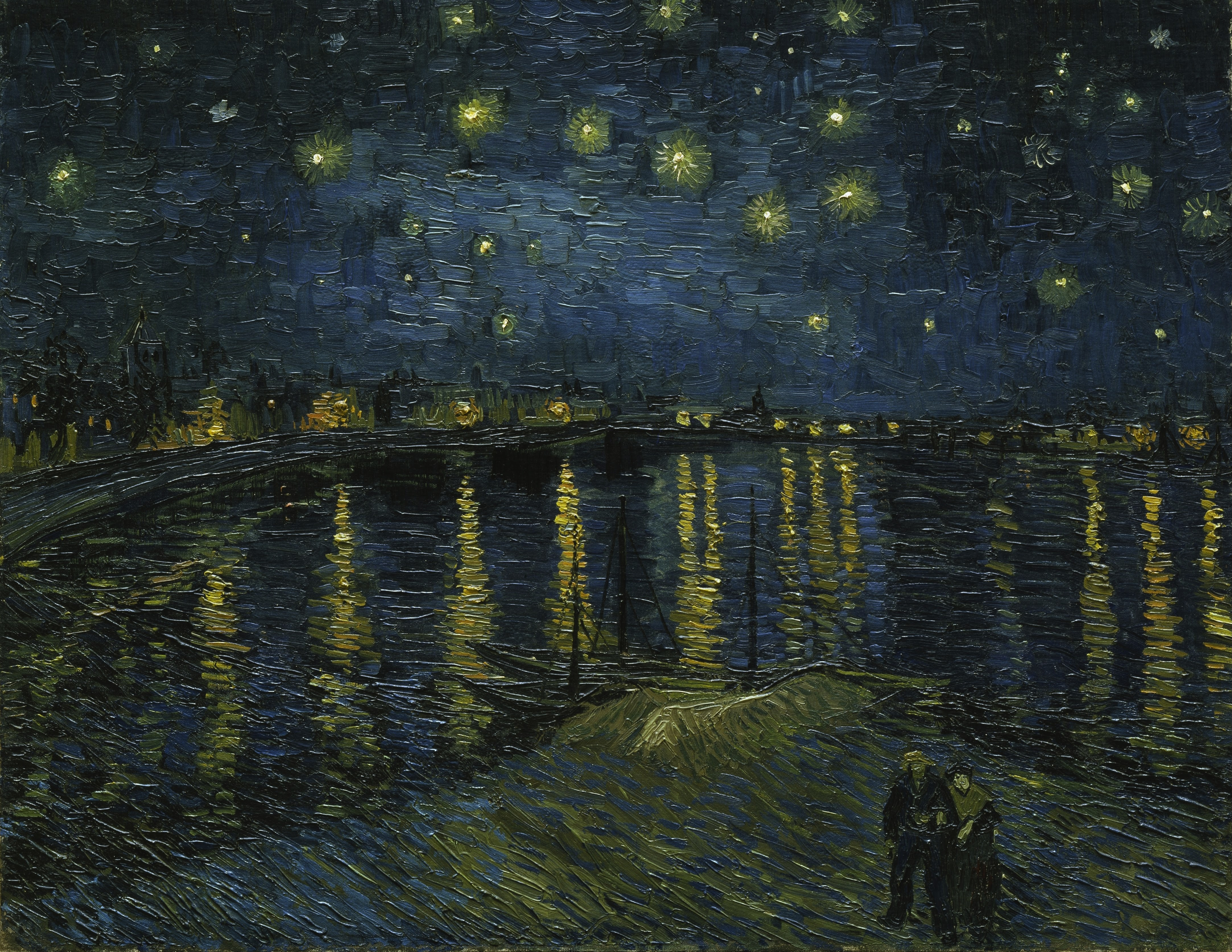
- Artist: Vincent van Gogh
- Year: 1888
- Catalogue: F474; JH1592
- Medium: Oil on canvas
- Dimensions: 72.5 cm × 92 cm (28.5 in × 36.2 in)
- Location: Musée d'Orsay, Paris

Starry Night (September 1888, French: La Nuit étoilée), commonly known as Starry Night Over the Rhône, is a Vincent van Gogh painting of the night sky in Arles. It was painted on the bank of the Rhône, only a one or two-minute walk from the Yellow House, which van Gogh was renting at the time. The night sky was the subject of some of van Gogh's most famous paintings, including Café Terrace at Night (painted earlier the same month) and the June 1889 canvas from Saint-Remy, and The Starry Night.

A sketch of the painting is included in a letter van Gogh sent to his friend Eugène Boch on October 2, 1888.

Starry Night, which is now in the Musée d'Orsay in Paris, was first exhibited in 1889 at Paris' annual exhibition of the Société des Artistes Indépendants. Vincent's brother, Theo, had this work displayed with van Gogh's Irises, although Vincent himself had proposed one of his paintings from the public gardens in Arles.

== Subject matter ==
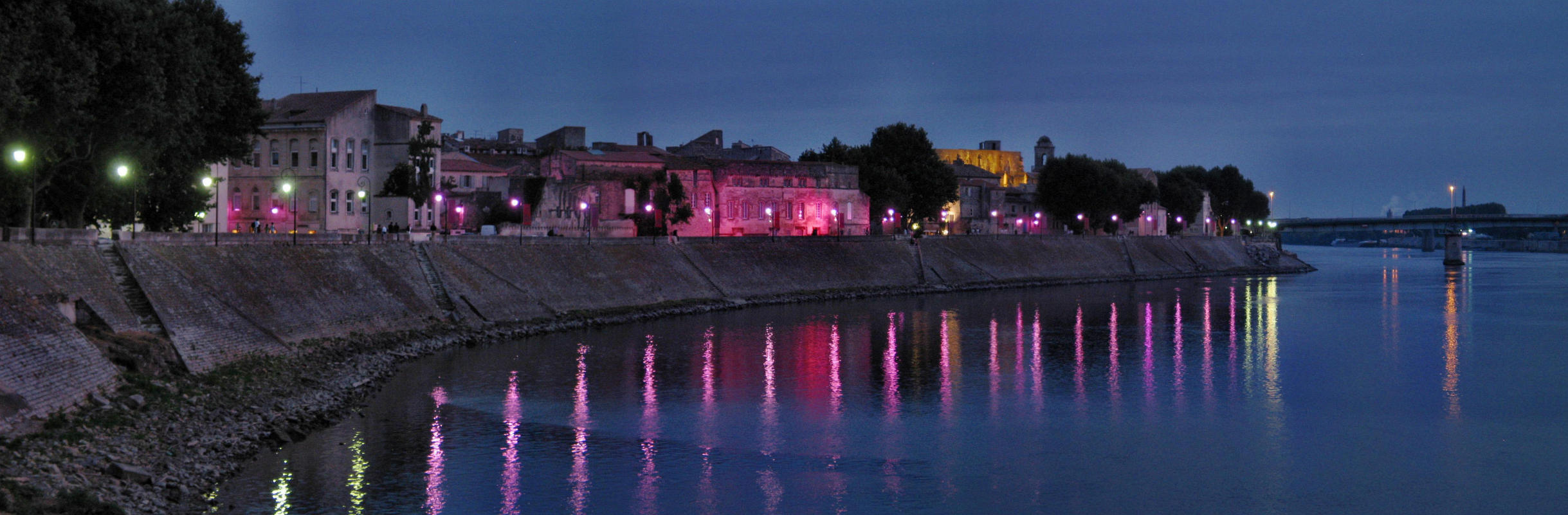
A similar view of the site, 2008

The view was from the wharf on the east side of the Rhône, the knee of the river bending towards the western shore, surrounding the rocks on which Arles is built. From the towers of Saint-Julien and Saint-Trophime at the left, the spectator follows the east bank up to the iron bridge connecting Arles to the suburb of Trinquetaille on the right western bank. This implies a view from place Lamartine towards the southwest (coordinates: 43.682367°N 4.630287°E). That implied view is not, however, consistent with the stars depicted in the art, as the Plough (Big Dipper) in the constellation Ursa Major would not have been visible from that direction.

== Genesis ==
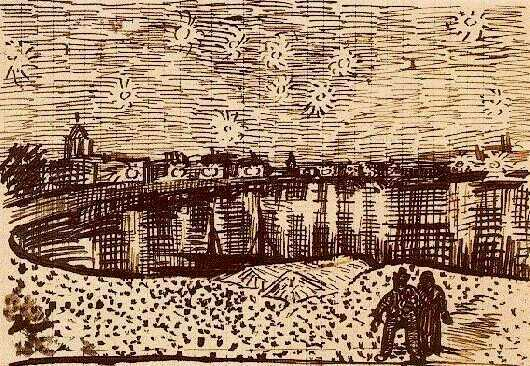
Letter sketch, October 2, 1888, now in the Van Gogh Museum, Amsterdam

Van Gogh announced and described this composition in a letter to his brother Theo:

Included a small sketch of a 30 square canvas—in short the starry sky painted by night, actually under a gas jet. The sky is aquamarine, the water is royal blue, the ground is mauve. The town is blue and purple. The gas is yellow and the reflections are russet gold descending down to green-bronze. On the aquamarine field of the sky the Great Bear is a sparkling green and pink, whose discreet paleness contrasts with the brutal gold of the gas. Two colorful figurines of lovers in the foreground.

The foreground indicates heavy rework, wet-in-wet, as soon as the first state was finished. The letter sketches executed at this time probably are based on the original composition.

== Colours of the night ==
The challenge of painting at night intrigued van Gogh. The vantage point he chose for Starry Night allowed him to capture the reflections of the gas lighting in Arles across the glimmering blue water of the Rhône. In the foreground, two lovers stroll by the banks of the river.

Depicting colour was of great importance to Vincent: in letters to his brother, Theo, he often described objects in his paintings in terms of colour. His night paintings, including Starry Night, emphasize the importance he placed on capturing the sparkling colours of the night sky and of the artificial lighting that was new to the era.

== Ursa Major ==
In September 1888, when Vincent van Gogh painted this picture on the banks of the Rhône, he was looking southwest towards the city of Arles. The Ursa Major is never visible from that direction as it is a circumpolar constellation. However, if he turned his head to the north, he would see the constellation as depicted. He ended up merging a terrestrial plane and a celestial plane in his painting. With this choice, the stars are now positioned above the gas lights and create the illusion that the water is illuminated by the stars themselves instead of just by the artificial lights.

== The technique for painting the stars ==
In 1888, he painted the stars to resemble flowers in the night sky. By the time he painted The Starry Night in 1889, his technique had evolved and the brightness of the stars is symbolized by concentric dotted circles.

== In popular culture ==
"Vincent" (also known as "Vincent [Starry, Starry Night]") is a 1971 song by Don McLean, written as a tribute to van Gogh.

== See also ==
- List of works by Vincent van Gogh

== Sources ==
- Boime, Albert: Van Gogh's Starry Night: A History of Matter and a Matter of History . Arts Magazine. 59 (4): 86–103. (also available on CD-ROM: ISBN 3-634-23015-0 (German version))
- Dorn, Roland: Décoration: Vincent van Gogh's Werkreihe für das Gelbe Haus in Arles, Georg Olms Verlag, Hildesheim, Zürich & New York 1990 ISBN 3-487-09098-8 / ISSN 0175-9558
