= Green Wheat Field with Cypress =

Painting by Vincent van Gogh

Champ de blé vert avec cyprès
- Green Wheat Field with Cypress (English)
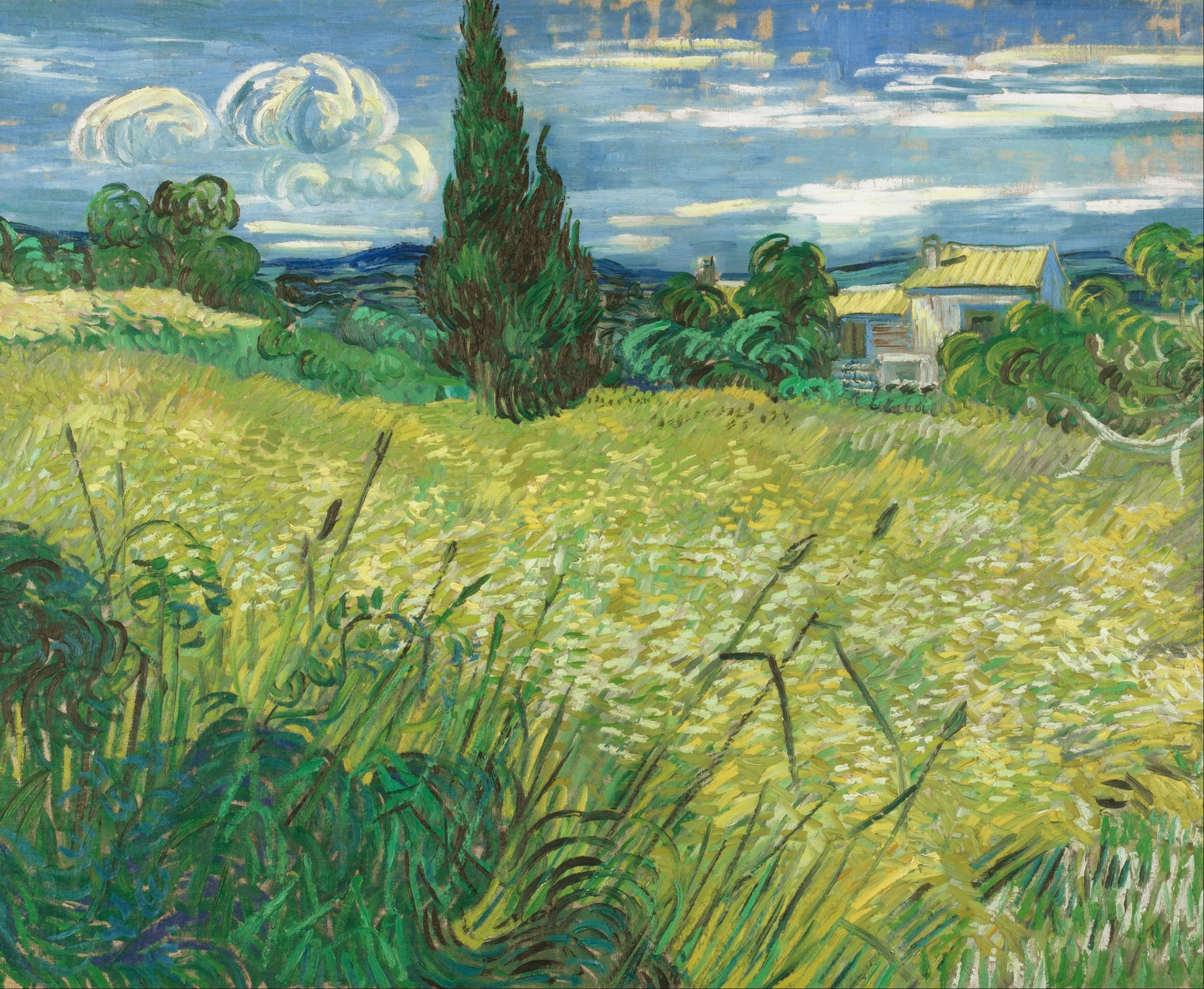
- Artist: Vincent van Gogh
- Year: 1889
- Catalogue: F719; JH1725
- Medium: Oil on canvas
- Dimensions: 73 cm × 92.5 cm (29 in × 36.4 in)
- Location: National Gallery Prague; Prague, Czech Republic

Green Wheat Field with Cypress (French: Champ de blé vert avec cyprès) is an oil-on-canvas painting by Dutch Post-Impressionist Vincent van Gogh. It is held by the National Gallery Prague, displayed at the Trade Fair Palace (Veletržní palác) in the district of Holešovice, where the painting is known as Zelené obilí ("Green wheat").

Like many similar works at this time, the landscape painting was made on a size 30 canvas and measures 73 cm × 93.5 cm (28.7 in × 36.8 in). It depicts a field of largely green wheat with parts ripening to yellow. A tall dark fastigiate cypress tree is at the centre of the scene, next to a small white house, with mountains in the background, and a blue sky with white clouds above. The painting was completed in 1889, while van Gogh was voluntarily incarcerated at the asylum of St. Paul near Saint-Rémy in Provence.

On 16 June 1889, Vincent wrote to his sister Wil that he had just completed the painting, just a few days after he was allowed out to paint en plein air:

Then yet another [landscape] that depicts a field of yellowing wheat surrounded by brambles and green bushes. At the end of the field a little pink house with a tall and dark cypress tree that stands out against the distant purplish and bluish hills, and against a forget-me-not blue sky streaked with pink whose pure tones contrast with the already heavy, scorched ears, whose tones are as warm as the crust of a loaf of bread."

He sent an ink drawing of the painting (F1548, JH1726) with a letter to his brother Theo in early July 1889. The drawing is now in the Morgan Library & Museum in New York City. Van Gogh probably sent the painting to Theo with a consignment in September 1889.

Van Gogh made several other paintings of wheat fields with cypresses when he was able to leave the asylum grounds and explore the local landscape, with the wheat rapidly turning to a ripe yellow. Besides a fondness for cypresses, van Gogh had a special affinity with wheat fields; he depicted them dozens of times over the years; to Vincent they symbolized the cycle of life and death, and he found in them both solace and inspiration.

Although the composition is similar to several paintings by other artists such as Monet, Renoir, Sisley, and Pissarro, the art historian Ronald Pickvance says that "compared to high Impressionist practice, color is used more locally and the brushstrokes are more organic and vigorously hatched." However, "with no spatial distortions, no excessively heightened color tonalities, and no revolutionary symbolism, this landscape affirms its normality within an Impressionist convention. It neither manifests psychological tension nor projects a morbid vision."

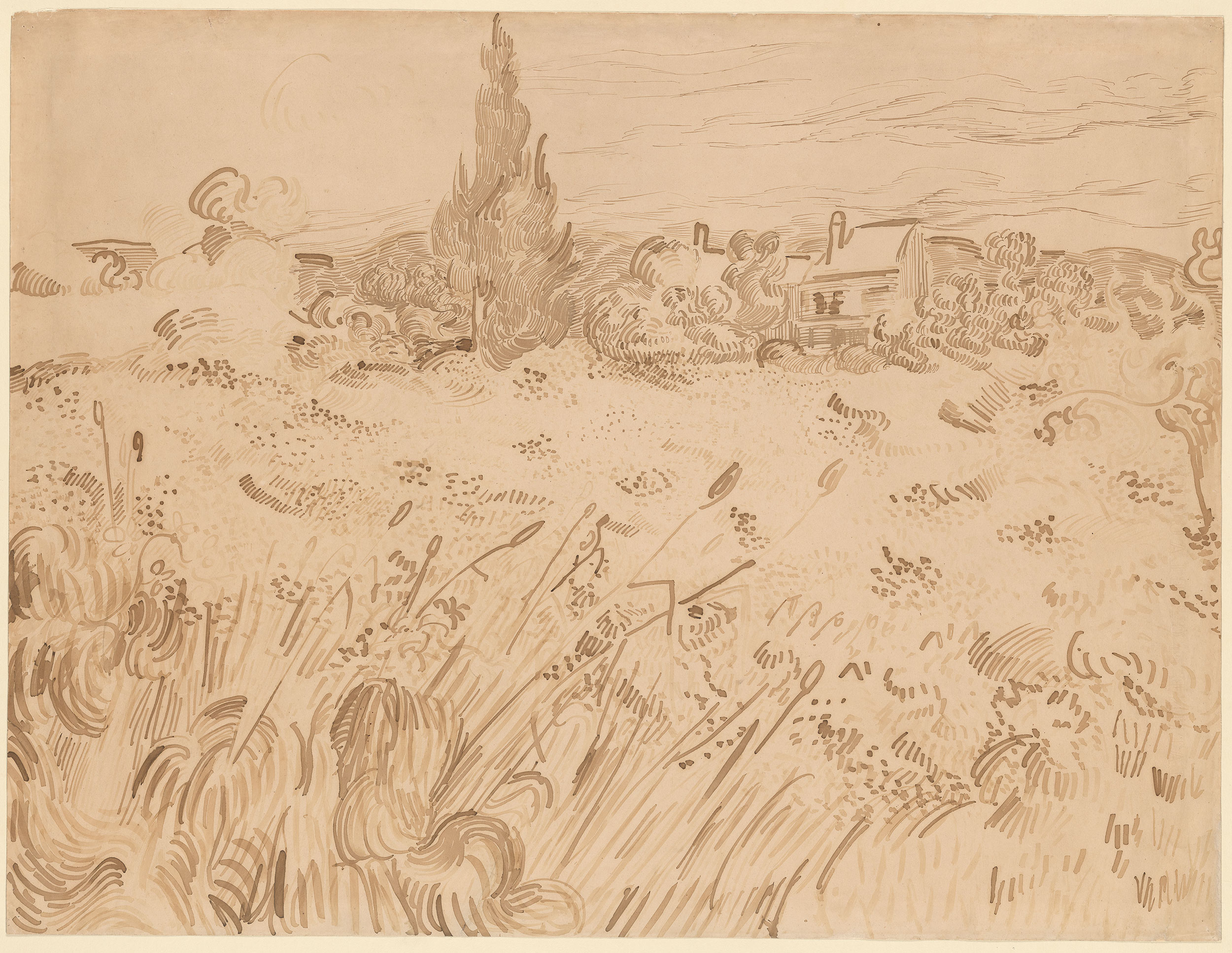
Ink drawing of the painting (F1548, JH1726), Morgan Library & Museum

== See also ==
- List of works by Vincent van Gogh
