= Irises (painting) =

Painting by Vincent van Gogh

- Les Iris (French)
- Artist: Vincent van Gogh
- Year: May 1889
- Catalogue: F608; JH1691; 90.PA.20
- Medium: Oil on canvas
- Dimensions: 71 cm × 93 cm (28 in × 36 5/8 in)
- Location: J. Paul Getty Museum, Los Angeles, California

Irises is an oil painting by Dutch artist Vincent van Gogh. Painted in 1889, the work is a landscape with a cropped composition and is one of a series of several hundred paintings that van Gogh made at the Saint Paul-de-Mausole asylum in Saint-Rémy-de-Provence, France, in the last year before his death in 1890. It has been in the permanent collection of The Getty in Los Angeles, California since 1990.

The painting depicts vibrantly blooming irises with dynamic brushstrokes. The flowers are a mix of deep blues and violets, contrasting with lush green leaves, red-orange earth, and yellow flowers in the background. Van Gogh's characteristic impasto technique adds texture and movement within the painting, creating an energetic and expressive feeling. The overall cropped composition of Irises, includes broad areas of vivid color and monumental rippled irises overflowing the borders of the canvas which helps move the viewer's eye throughout the canvas.

== Background ==
=== Saint-Rémy ===
In May 1889, Van Gogh voluntarily entered the Saint-Paul-de-Mausole asylum in nearby Saint-Rémy, where he painted around 150 canvases over the course of the next year. His initial confinement to the hospital grounds is reflected in his imagery, from depictions of its corridors to the irises and lilacs of its walled garden, visible from the window of the spare room allocated as his studio. Vincent was restricted to the premises, where his only connection with nature was the enclosed garden and the view from his bedroom window. He visited the garden to find solace in painting, an early example of what is now called art therapy. In a letter to his brother Theo, Van Gogh mentioned that he had begun a painting of 'violet irises', a reference to Irises. Van Gogh was optimistic about the restorative effects of painting in the hospital garden, writing: "I believe that all my faculties for work will come back to me quite quickly".

Van Gogh started painting Irises within a month of his one-year stay at Saint-Paul-de-Mausole, in May 1889, working from nature in the hospital garden. Van Gogh himself regarded this painting as a study, and there are no known drawings for it. Irises bears a direct trace of his work there: embedded in the paint is one of the pollen cones that fall in abundance from the umbrella pines in the garden.

During his stay at the Saint-Paul-de-Mausole asylum, Van Gogh painted several depictions of irises. Another painting, Iris, depicts a single iris among grasses. Iris must have been painted before Irises, as it portrays just one mature flower and multiple developing buds, whereas Irises is filled with flowers, some of which have begun to wilt. Bearded irises bloom for around three weeks, with some variation depending on the temperature, so it can be inferred that the two paintings were separated by around ten days or so. Given that Vincent tells his brother Theo of his work on Irises in a letter written shortly after his arrival at the asylum, and given Iris's similarity in style and palette to four other nature studies usually dated to the end of his time in Arles, it seems likely that Iris may be among the last things he painted before his admission to the asylum.

After its completion in 1889, Van Gogh wrote to Theo to send him four rolls of canvases and seven studies, including Irises.

=== Japanese influence ===
Van Gogh was a dedicated collector of Japanese prints. Like many European artists of his generation, Van Gogh immersed himself in the art of Japan. Japanese artists used large areas of colour in their compositions, often with a sharp diagonal. Japanese artists regularly focused in on detail in the foreground. Van Gogh associated irises with Japan, where the native species were highly prized and had a prominent place in art. Van Gogh adopted these elements in his paintings, but in his imagination he combined Japan and Provence. For him, both were exotic places that beckoned with a stronger sun, clearer skies and brighter colours.

The painting was most likely influenced by Japanese ukiyo-e woodblock prints like many of his earlier works and those by other artists of the time.

=== Color scheme ===
A crucial part of Van Gogh's art was his ideas about color theory. Central to his understanding of color was the work of the French chemist Michel-Eugène Chevreul, whose law of simultaneous color contrast describes how our perception of a particular color is influenced by other colors in the vicinity. Chevreul postulated that each color has a specific complementary color. For example, red, yellow, and blue are complemented by green, purple, and orange. According to Chevreul, juxtaposing a primary color with its complementary secondary color—yellow next to violet, for example—intensifies both. Many artists found Chevreul's observations in Charles Blanc's widely distributed Grammaire des arts du dessin. In this book, Blanc referred to the use of complementary colors by Eugène Delacroix, a painter van Gogh greatly admired.

=== Exhibition ===
Irises was first exhibited at the Société des Artistes Indépendants in September 1889, along with Starry Night Over the Rhône. Submitted by his brother Theo, he wrote to Vincent on 5 September 1889 to let him know the exhibition was open. Theo wrote, "Now I still have to tell you that the exhibition of the Indépendants is open, and that your two pictures are there, the 'Irises' and 'The Starlit Night'...They have to put it on the narrow wall of the room, and it strikes the eye from afar. It is a beautiful study full of air and life."

Theo also wrote about these two pieces to Willemina 27 November 1889: "I submitted two paintings to the exhibition of the Indépendants that made a very good impression. A field of irises and the starry night, view of Arles with the street-lamps and the stars reflecting in the Rhône."

== Materials ==
The painting materials used in Van Gogh's artwork were analyzed by researchers and they used both "non-invasive methods and invasive methods" to analyze van Gogh's painting materials, according to Devi Ormond, Associate Paintings Conservator at the J. Paul Getty Museum. Non-invasive techniques helped identify "remnants of the red paint that we can’t see with the naked eye," while invasive methods, like creating cross-sections of the paint layers, revealed that beneath the blue top layer lies a faded violet. "As we go down deeper into the painting, you see this wonderful violet color," Ormond noted, explaining that it was originally created by mixing geranium lake red and blue—a combination that has since faded to reveal only the blue.

The analysis also identified cobalt blue and ultramarine pigments, creating "many different shades and hues of violet" across the petals. Dr. Beth Harris observed that some areas now appearing as "muddy brown" were once "a brilliant orange," while Ormond pointed out that a "dirty-looking brown" in the flowers was initially a vivid red, showing the impact of color fading over time.

== Interpretations ==
Félix Fénéon, an early and avid spokesman for the Neo-Impressionists contributed his account of Irises, which appeared in the symbolist review La Vogue in September 1889. Fénéon wrote "Irises violently slash into long strips their violet petals on sword-like leaves."

In a video by Smarthistory, Dr. Scott Allan raises the question of how to categorise the artwork, reflecting on its intriguing viewpoint, which suggests that Van Gogh may have been sitting or kneeling. Allan notes that it doesn't fit the traditional definitions of landscape—it lacks "the scale and the space and the view"—or the characteristics of a still life; it is not lifeless nor evokes "nature morte" or "dead nature". Instead, he emphasises that the irises depicted are "still rooted in the earth" and "intensely alive". This makes the subject a depiction of vibrant life rather than stillness, "It's a picture of moving life connected to the earth".

== Provenance ==
The first owner was Julien "Père" Tanguy, a paint grinder and art dealer whose portrait Van Gogh painted three times. In 1892 Tanguy sold Irises to art critic and anarchist Octave Mirbeau who was also one of van Gogh's first supporters. Mirbeau paid 300 francs for it and later used it as a subject in his novel In the Sky.

In 1987, it became the most expensive painting ever sold, setting a record which stood for two and a half years. Then it was sold for US$53.9 million to Alan Bond, but Bond did not have enough money to pay for it. Irises was later re-sold in 1990 to the J. Paul Getty Museum in Los Angeles. Irises is currently (as of 2022) thirty-first on the inflation-adjusted list of most expensive paintings ever sold and in 102nd place if the effects of inflation are ignored.

== See also ==
- List of works by Vincent van Gogh
- Saint-Paul Asylum, Saint-Rémy (van Gogh series)
