= Boats du Rhône =

Series of artworks by Vincent van Gogh

Quay with Sand Barges
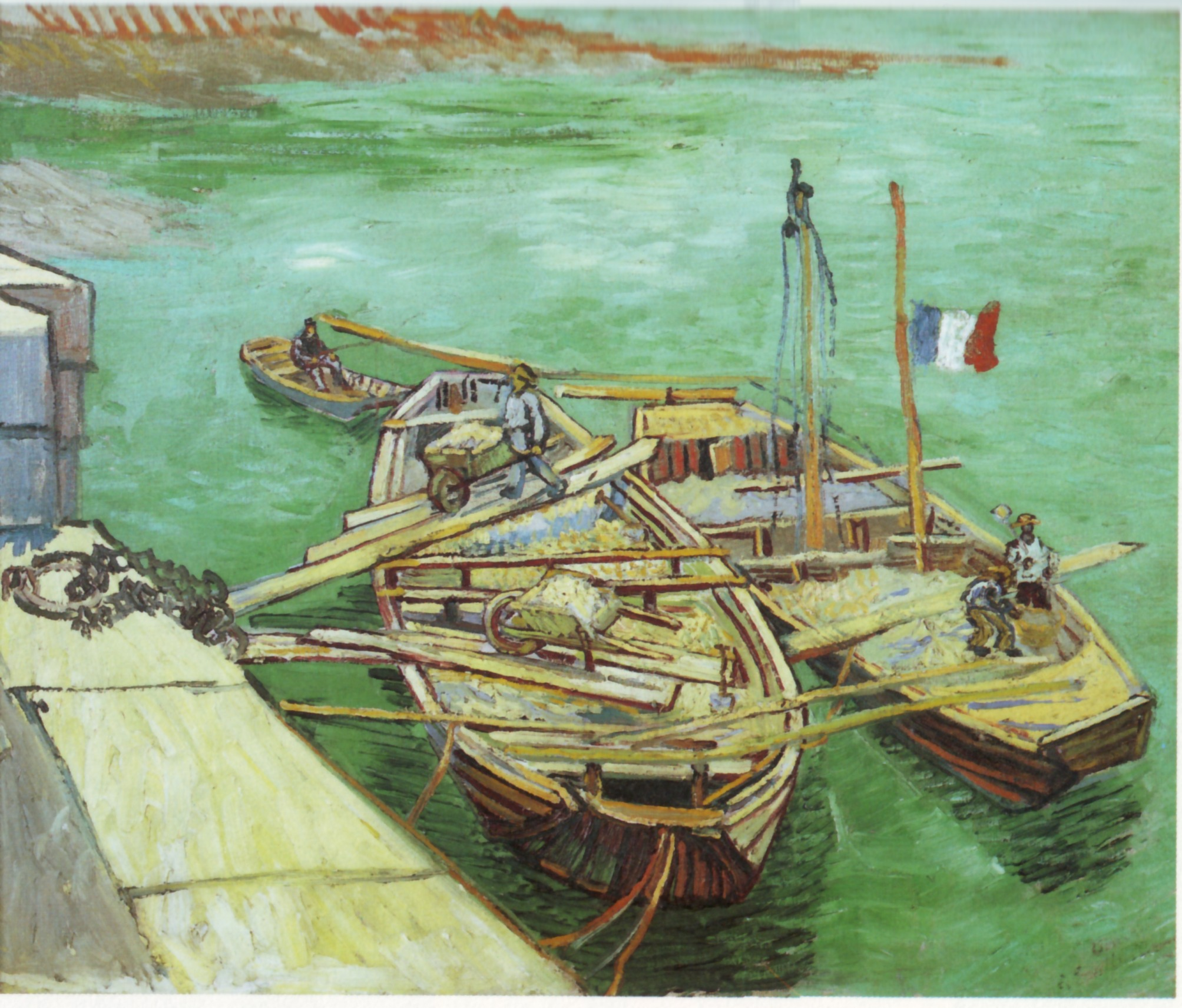
- Artist: Vincent van Gogh
- Year: 1888
- Catalogue: F449 JH1558
- Medium: Oil on canvas
- Dimensions: 55.0 cm × 66.0 cm (21.7 in × 26.0 in)
- Location: Museum Folkwang; Essen

Quay with Sand Barges, Sketch
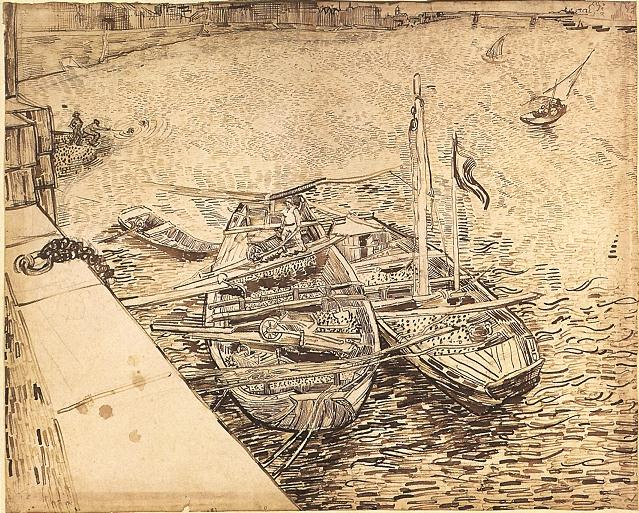
- Artist: Vincent van Gogh
- Year: 1888
- Catalogue: F1462 JH1559
- Type: Pen with reed pen
- Dimensions: 48.0 cm × 62.5 cm (18.9 in × 24.6 in)
- Location: The Smithsonian; New York City

Coal Barges
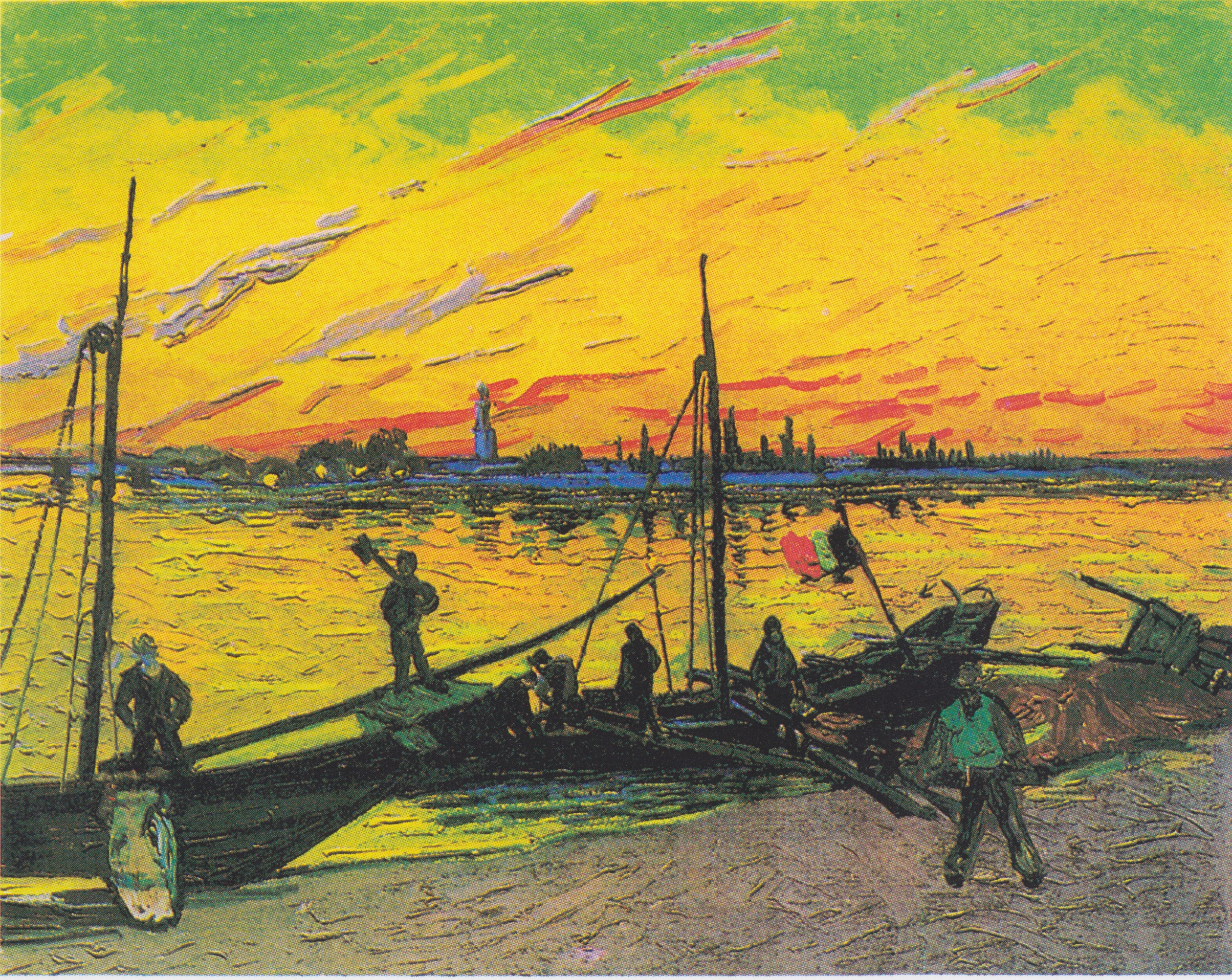
- Artist: Vincent van Gogh
- Year: 1888
- Catalogue: F437 JH1570
- Medium: Oil on canvas
- Dimensions: 71.0 cm × 95.0 cm (28.0 in × 37.4 in)
- Location: Private Collection; Maryland

Men Unloading Coal Barges
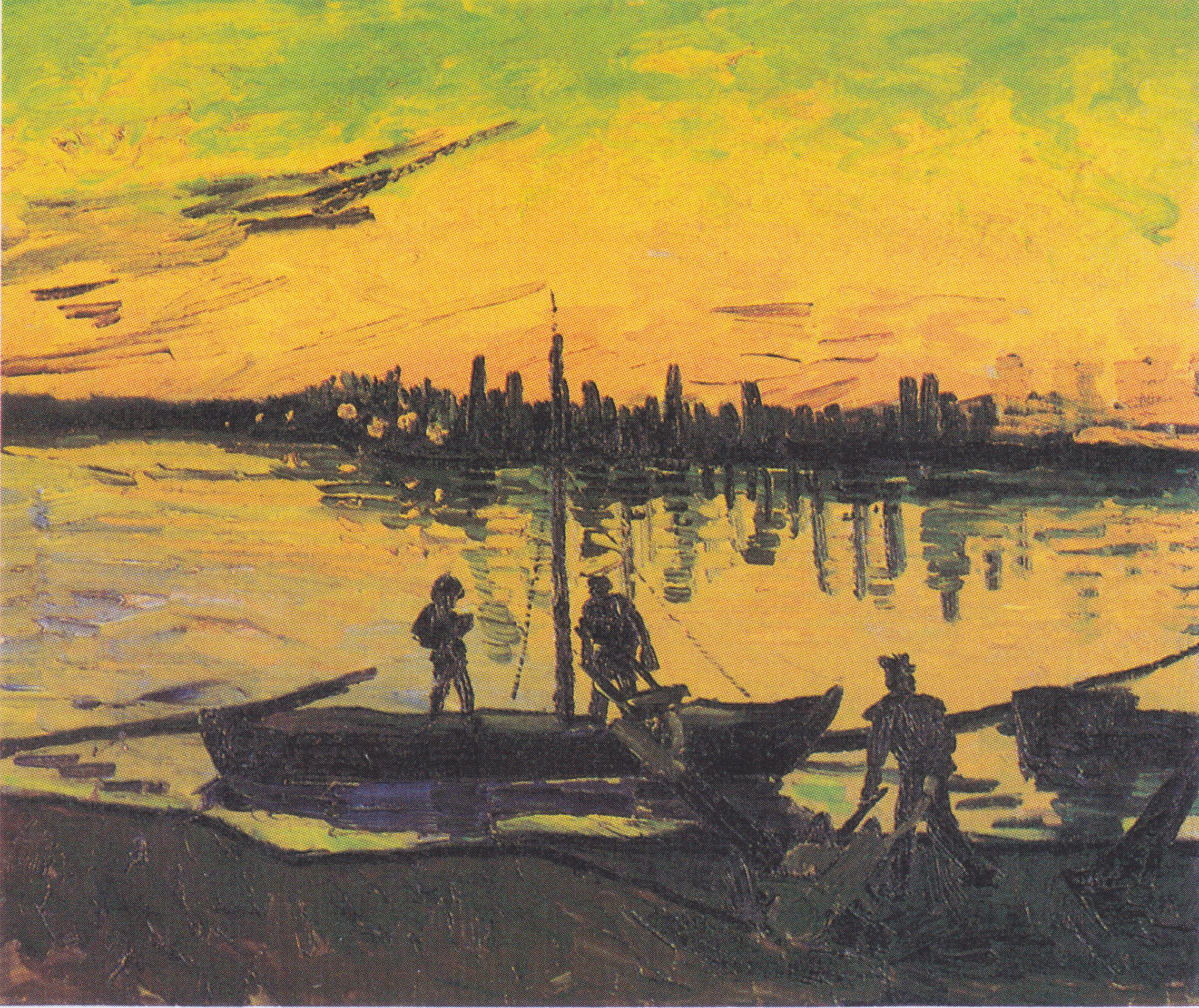
- Artist: Vincent van Gogh
- Year: 1888
- Catalogue: F438 JH1571
- Medium: Oil on canvas
- Dimensions: 54.0 cm × 64.0 cm (21.3 in × 25.2 in)
- Location: Thyssen-Bornemisza Museum; Madrid

Boats du Rhône is a series of two sketches (a small one in a letter, the other very large and detailed with a reed pen) and three oil paintings, listed below, created by the Dutch artist Vincent van Gogh while living in Arles, France, during August, 1888.

== Genesis ==
Van Gogh described his intention in a letter written August 13, 1888:

At the moment I’m working on a study [...] boats seen from a quay, from above; the two boats are a purplish pink, the water is very green, no sky, a tricolor flag on the mast. A workman with a wheelbarrow is unloading sand. I have a drawing of it too.

Painted a few hundred metres behind his Yellow House, where the railway yard abuts the Rhône river, he had written his brother Theo two weeks earlier:

I saw a magnificent and very strange effect this evening. A very large boat laden with coal on the Rhône, moored at the quay. Seen from above it was all glistening and wet from a shower; the water was a white yellow and clouded pearl-grey, the sky lilac and an orange strip in the west, the town violet. On the boat, small workmen, blue and dirty white, were coming and going, carrying the cargo ashore. It was pure Hokusai. It was too late to do it, but one day, when this coal-boat comes back, it’ll have to be tackled.

A series was created, as argued by the Van Gogh Museum's curators Leo Jansen, Hans Luijten and Nienke Bakker, because van Gogh "split the subject he describes here into two, perhaps because he realised that a high vantage point and a sunset are very hard to reconcile in a single composition." They conclude, "We do not know exactly when the latter two studies were made; there may be a connection with a letter 697, in which Van Gogh says he has painted a sunset."

A leading 20th century van Gogh scholar, Jan Hulsker explained:

The very detailed large drawing, referred to here must have been made first. In fact, Vincent had already sent off the drawing even while he was still working on the study and it is interesting to note how far he went in trying to simplify it in comparison with the drawing. He left out the small sailing boats in the background and the Rhône bridge [...] In the painting he was particularly concerned with the forceful contrasts of the colours.

This argument has been expanded to:

Since the vantage point in Quay with Sand Barges is completely different from those with a sunset, it should be considered on its own, in particular as a Symbolist or sacred realism homage to Eugène Delacroix's Christ asleep during the tempest. When we consider van Gogh has replicated not only the colour of the sea and the likeness of the boat (with a tricolor flag), but also, as evidenced in his earlier sketch, he has transformed Arles’ cityscape into a mountain, there is little doubt the Delacroix heavily inspired this composition, especially when we read this admonition to his artist friend Émile Bernard, whom he dedicated the painting to, “If the study I’m sending you in exchange doesn’t suit you, just look at it a little longer” repeating this sentiment again in the next paragraph.

== See also ==
- List of works by Vincent van Gogh

== Bibliography ==
- de la Faille, Jacob-Baart. The Works of Vincent van Gogh: His Paintings and Drawings. Amsterdam: Meulenhoff, 1970. ISBN 978-1556608117
- Hulsker, Jan. The Complete Van Gogh. Oxford: Phaidon, 1980. ISBN 0-7148-2028-8
- Jansen, Leo, Luijten, Hans, and Bakker, Nienke Vincent van Gogh – The Letters: The Complete Illustrated and Annotated Edition, (Vol. 1-6), Thames & Hudson, 2009, ISBN 0821226304
- Naifeh, Steven; Smith, Gregory White. Van Gogh: The Life. Profile Books, 2011. ISBN 978-1846680106
- Tralbaut, Marc Edo. Vincent van Gogh, Macmillan, London 1969, ISBN 0-333-10910-4
