= Van Gogh Museum =

National art museum in the Netherlands

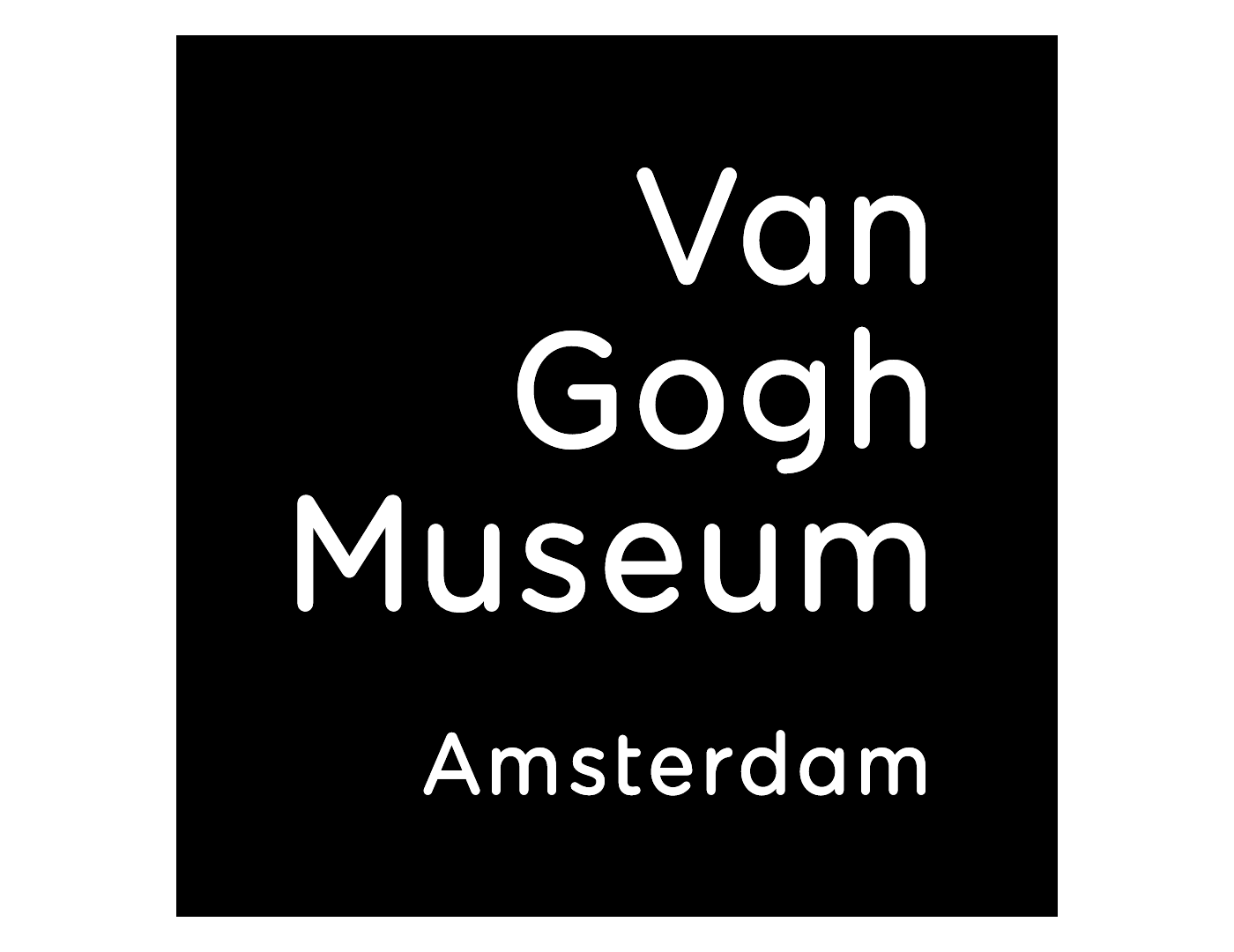

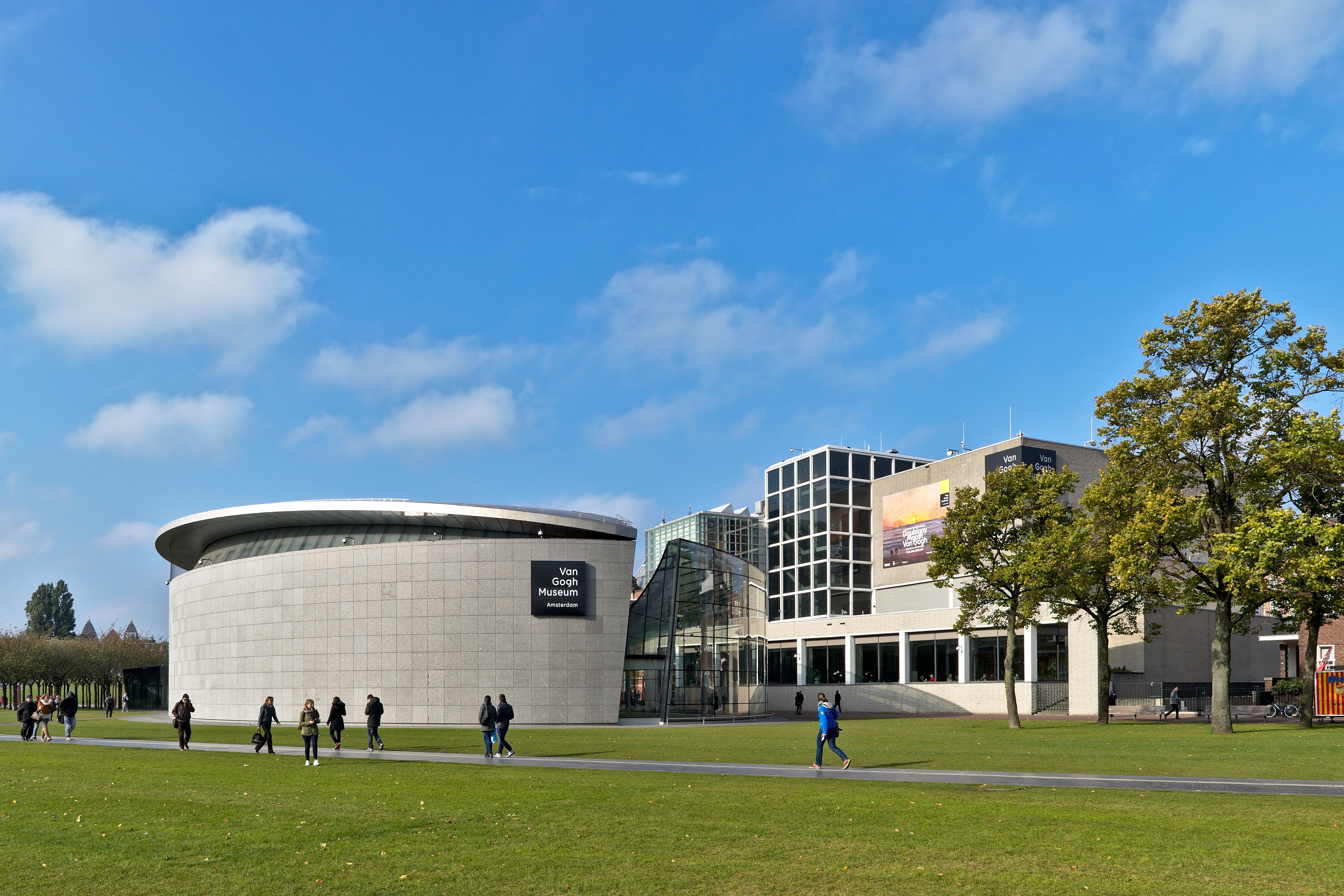
- Museum at the Museumplein in 2016
- Interactive fullscreen map
- Established: 2 June 1973
- Location: Paulus Potterstraat 7 Amsterdam, Netherlands
- Coordinates: 52°21′30″N 4°52′52″E
- Type: Art museum National museum
- Visitors: 2.1 million (2016); 2.3 million (2017); Ranked 1st nationally (2018); Ranked 24th globally (2018)
- Public transit access: Van Baerlestraat/Museumplein; Tram line: 2, 3, 5, 12, 16, 24
- Website: www.vangoghmuseum.nl

The Van Gogh Museum (Dutch pronunciation: [vɑŋˈɣɔx mʏˌzeːjʏm]) is a Dutch art museum dedicated to the works of Vincent van Gogh and his contemporaries in the Museum Square in Amsterdam South, close to the Stedelijk Museum, the Rijksmuseum, and the Concertgebouw. The museum opened on 2 June 1973, and its buildings were designed by Gerrit Rietveld and Kisho Kurokawa.

The museum contains the largest collection of Van Gogh's paintings and drawings in the world. In 2017, the museum had 2.3 million visitors and was the most-visited museum in the Netherlands, and the 23rd-most-visited art museum in the world. In 2019, the Van Gogh Museum launched the Meet Vincent Van Gogh Experience, a technology-driven "immersive exhibition" on Van Gogh's life and works, which has toured globally.

== History ==
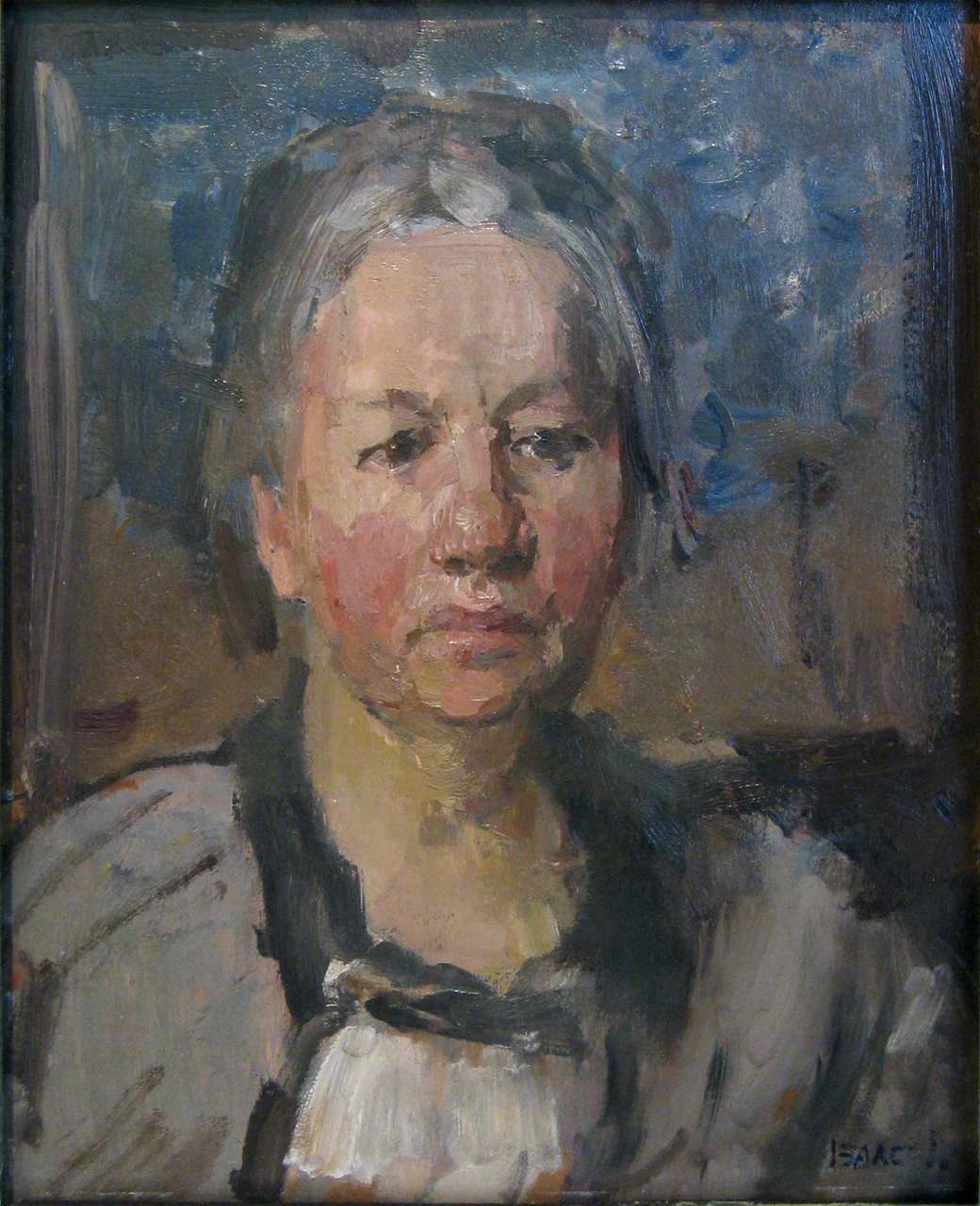
Johanna van Gogh-Bonger (1925) by Isaac Israëls

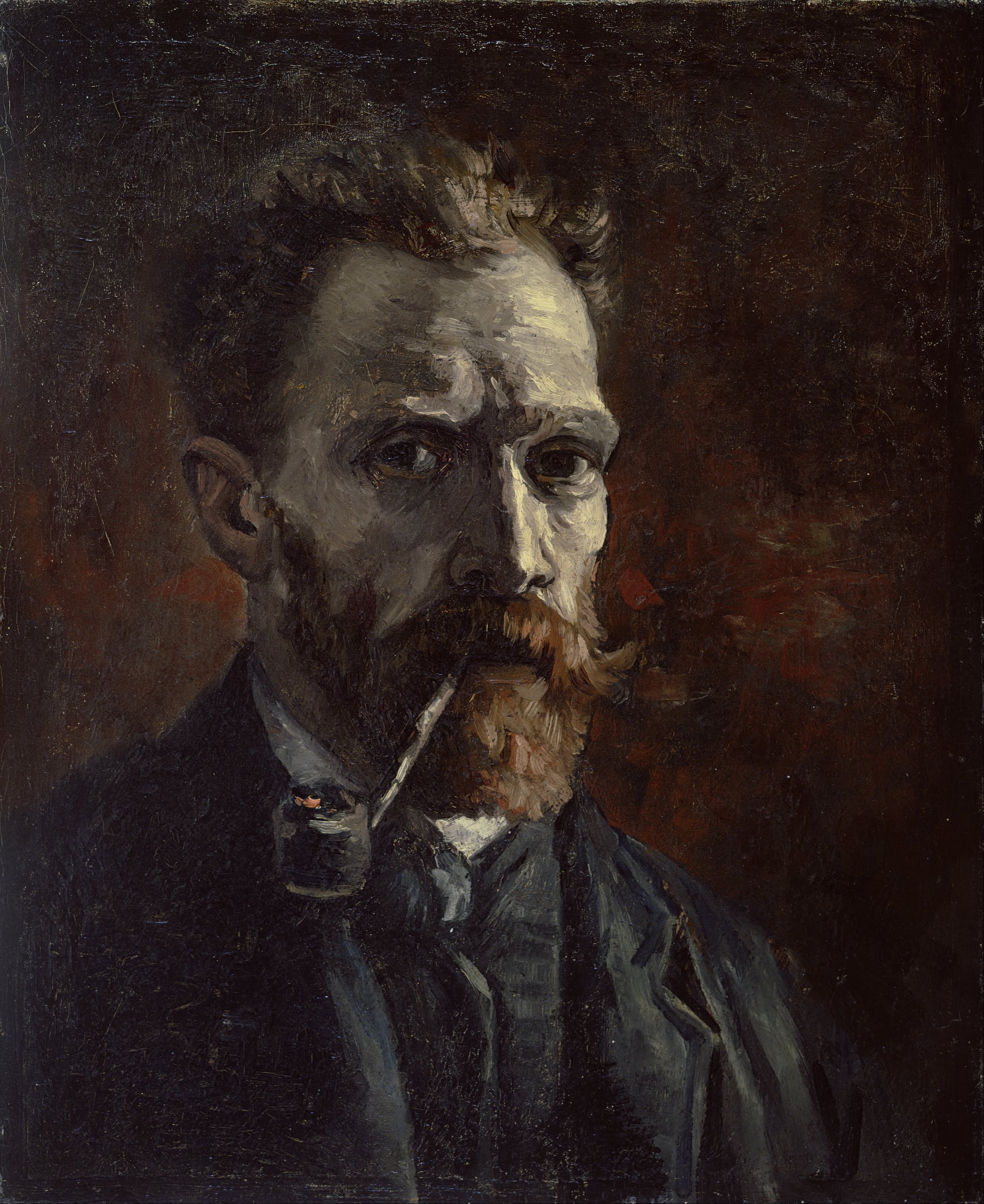
Vincent van Gogh, Self-portrait with pipe, 1886, Van Gogh Museum

=== Unsold works ===
Upon Vincent van Gogh's death in 1890, his work not sold fell into the possession of his brother Theo. Theo died six months after Vincent, leaving the work in the possession of his widow, Johanna van Gogh-Bonger. Selling many of Vincent's paintings with the ambition of spreading knowledge of his artwork, Johanna maintained a private collection of his works. The collection was inherited by her son Vincent Willem van Gogh in 1925, eventually loaned to the Stedelijk Museum in Amsterdam, where it was displayed for many years, and was transferred to the state-initiated Vincent van Gogh Foundation in 1962. In the years following her husband’s death, Johanna van Gogh-Bonger organized exhibitions of Vincent van Gogh's work in the Netherlands and abroad, significantly contributing to his posthumous recognition.

=== Dedicated museum ===
Design for a Van Gogh Museum was commissioned by the Dutch government in 1963 to Dutch architect and furniture designer Gerrit Rietveld. Rietveld died a year later, and the building was not completed until 1973, when the museum opened its doors. In 1998 and 1999, the building was renovated by the Dutch architect Martien van Goor, and an exhibition wing by the Japanese architect Kisho Kurokawa was added. A renovation of the museum building was announced in 2011. The museum shuttered for renovations in September 2012, reopening in May 2013. During this period, 75 works from the collection were shown in the H'ART Museum.

On 9 September 2013, the museum unveiled a long-lost Van Gogh painting that spent years in a Norwegian attic believed to be by another painter. It is the first full-size canvas by him discovered since 1928. Sunset at Montmajour depicts trees, bushes and sky, painted with Van Gogh's familiar thick brush strokes. It can be dated to the exact day it was painted because he described it in a letter to his brother, Theo, and said he painted it the previous day 4 July 1888.

By the 2020s, the Van Gogh Museum was planning to renovate its building for €104 million. In August 2025, the museum warned that it might be forced to close unless the Dutch government increased its annual subsidy to the museum from €8.5 million to €11 million; the increased subsidy would fund part of the renovation.

=== Art thefts ===
In 1991, twenty paintings were stolen from the museum, among them Van Gogh's early painting The Potato Eaters. Although the thieves escaped from the building, 35 minutes later all stolen paintings were recovered from an abandoned car. Three paintings – Wheatfield with Crows, Still Life with Bible, and Still Life with Fruit – were severely torn during the theft. Four men, including two museum guards, were convicted of the theft and given six or seven-year sentences. It is considered to be the largest art theft in the Netherlands since the Second World War.

In 2002, two paintings were stolen from the museum, Congregation Leaving the Reformed Church in Nuenen and View of the Sea at Scheveningen. Two Dutchmen were convicted of the theft to four-and-a-half-year sentences, but the paintings were not immediately recovered. The museum offered a reward of €100,000 for information leading to the recovery of the paintings. The FBI Art Crime Team listed the robbery on their Top Ten Art Crimes list, and estimates the combined value of the paintings at US$30 million. In September 2016, both paintings were discovered by the Guardia di Finanza in Castellammare di Stabia, Italy in a villa belonging to the Camorra drug trafficker Raffaele Imperiale. The two artworks were found in a "relatively good state", according to the Van Gogh Museum.

== Buildings ==
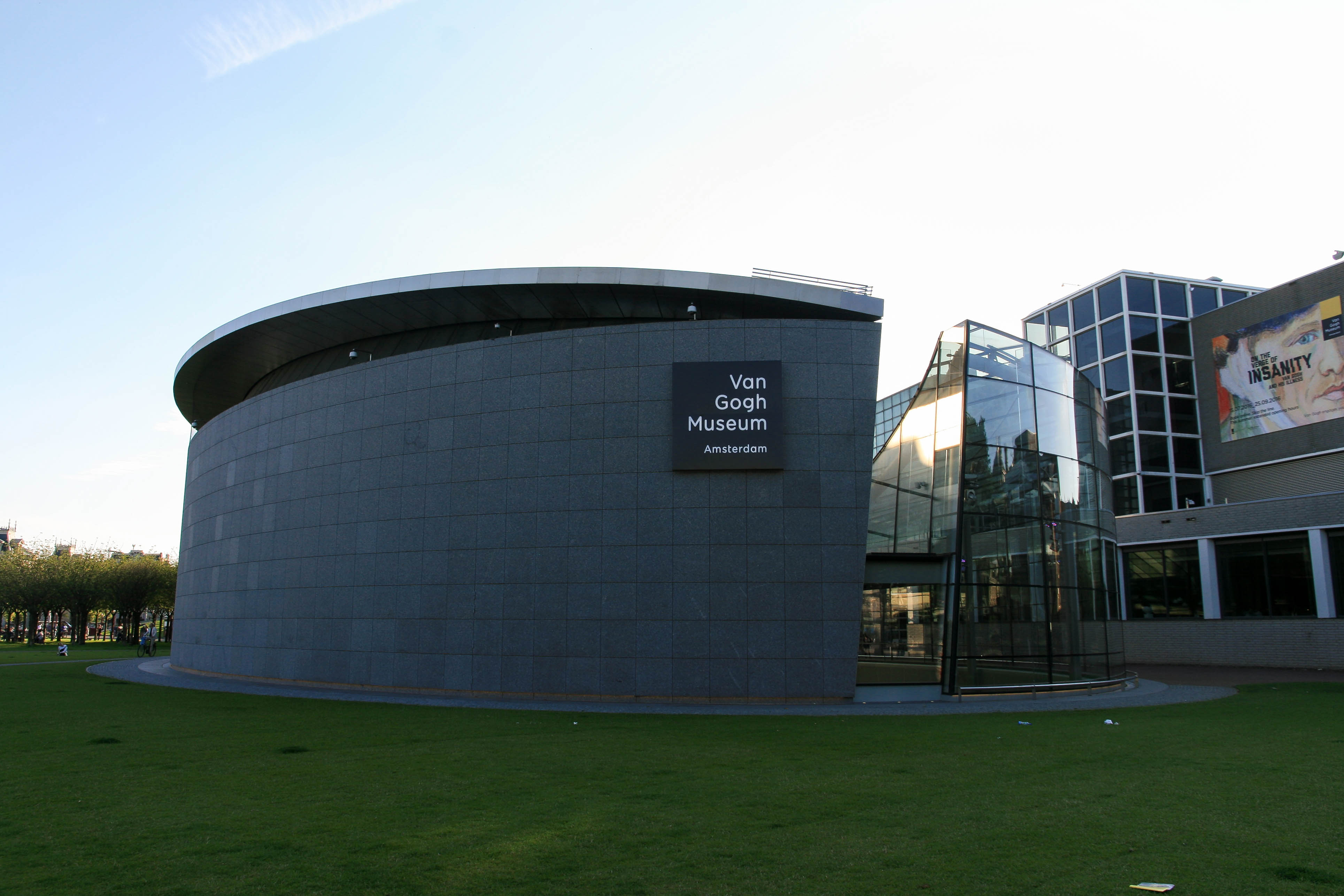
Entrance building

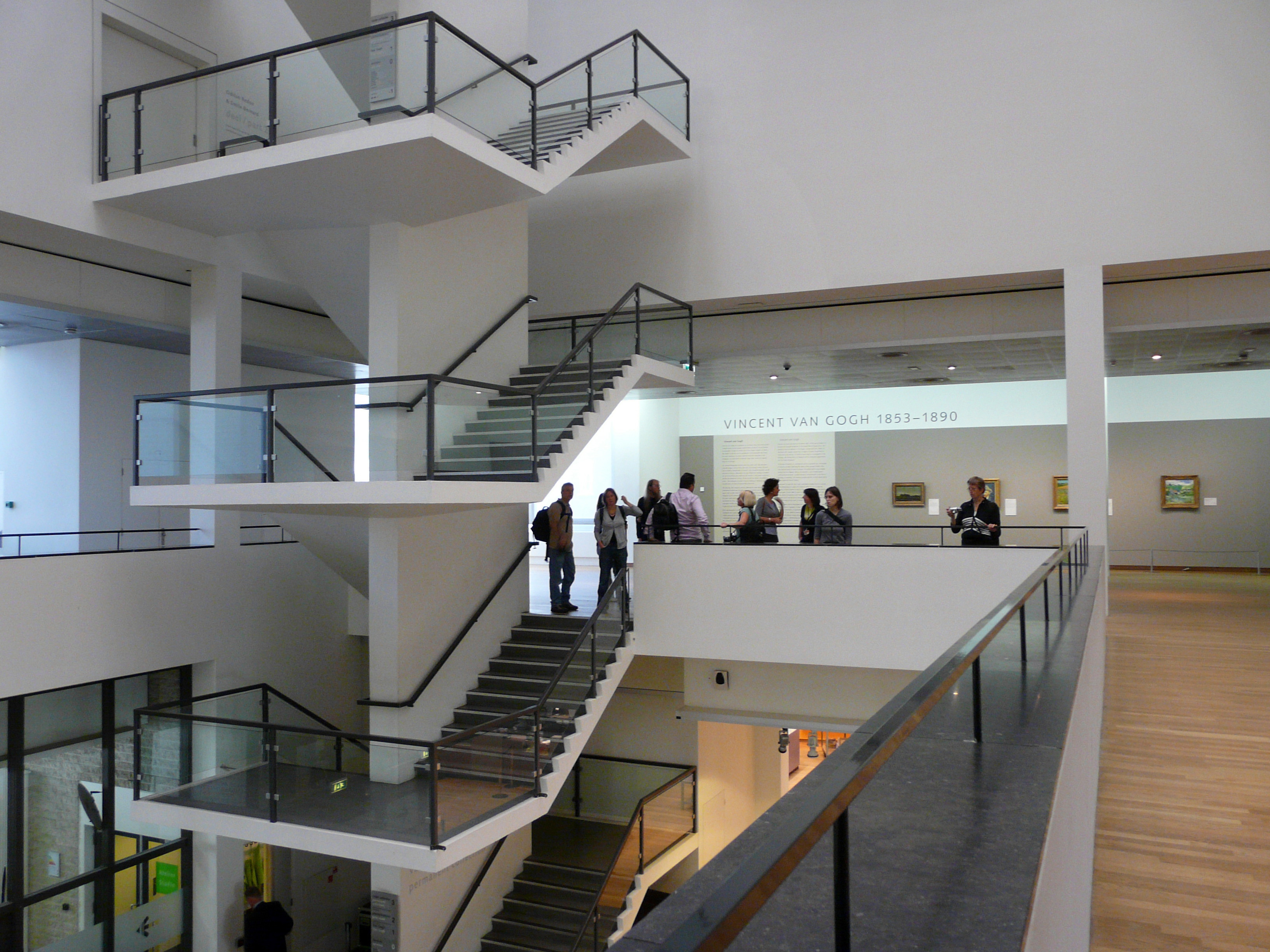
Rietveld building

The museum is situated at the Museumplein in Amsterdam-Zuid, on the Paulus Potterstraat 7, between the Stedelijk Museum and the Rijksmuseum, and consists of two buildings, the Rietveld building, designed by Gerrit Rietveld, and the Kurokawa wing, designed by Kisho Kurokawa. Museum offices are housed on Stadhouderskade 55 in Amsterdam-Zuid. Depending on the season, sunflowers are displayed outside the entrance to the museum.

=== Rietveld building ===
The Rietveld building is the main structure and houses the permanent collection. It has a rectangular floor plan and is four stories high. On the ground floor are a shop, a café, and an introductory exhibition. The first floor shows the works of Van Gogh grouped chronologically. The second floor gives information about the restoration of paintings and has a space for minor temporary exhibitions. The third floor shows paintings of Van Gogh's contemporaries in relationship to the work of Van Gogh himself.

=== Kurokawa wing ===
The Kurokawa wing is used for major temporary exhibitions. It has an oval floor plan and is three stories high. The entrance to the Kurokawa wing is via a tunnel from the Rietveld building.

== Collection ==
=== Works by Vincent van Gogh ===
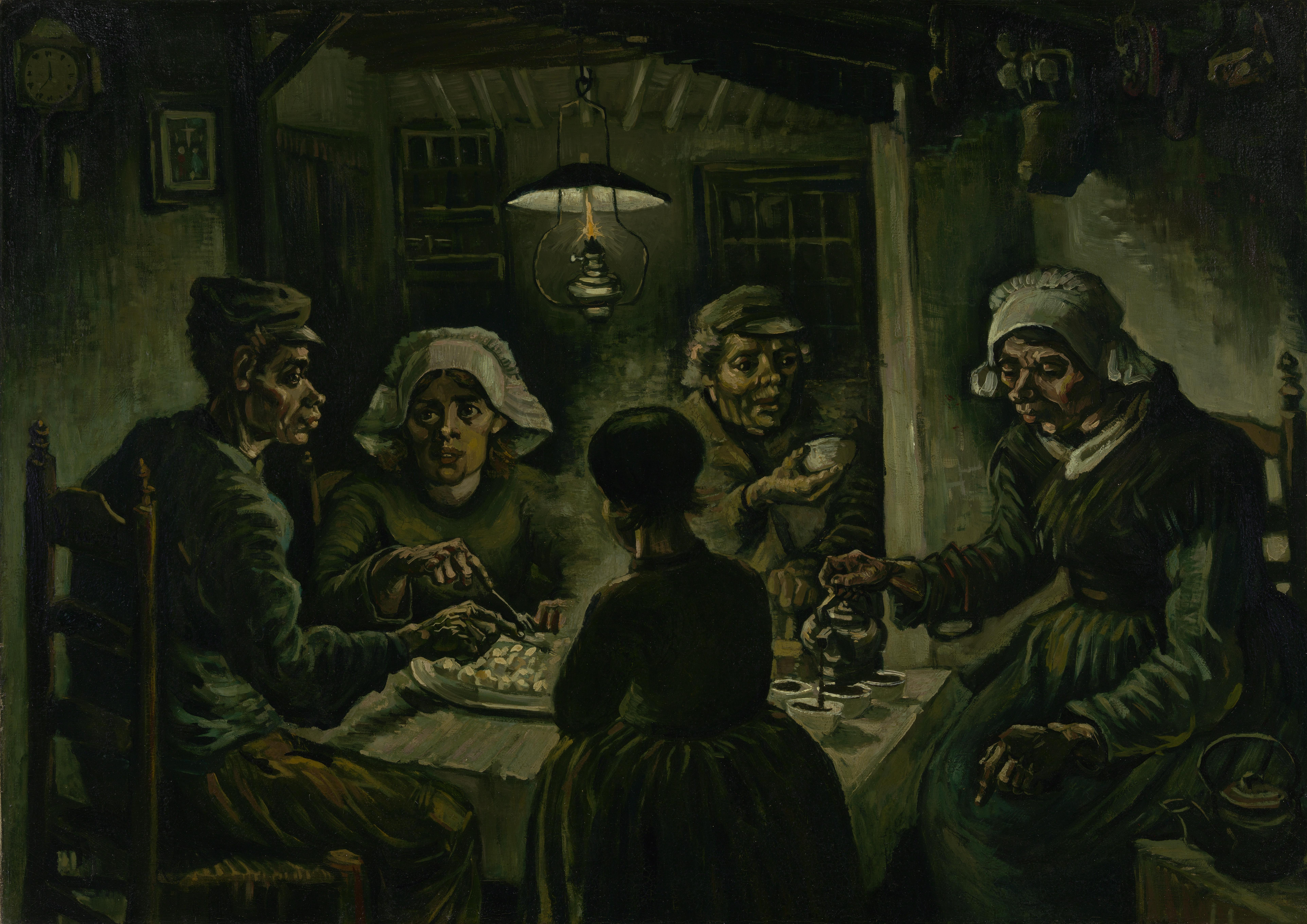
The Potato Eaters (1885)

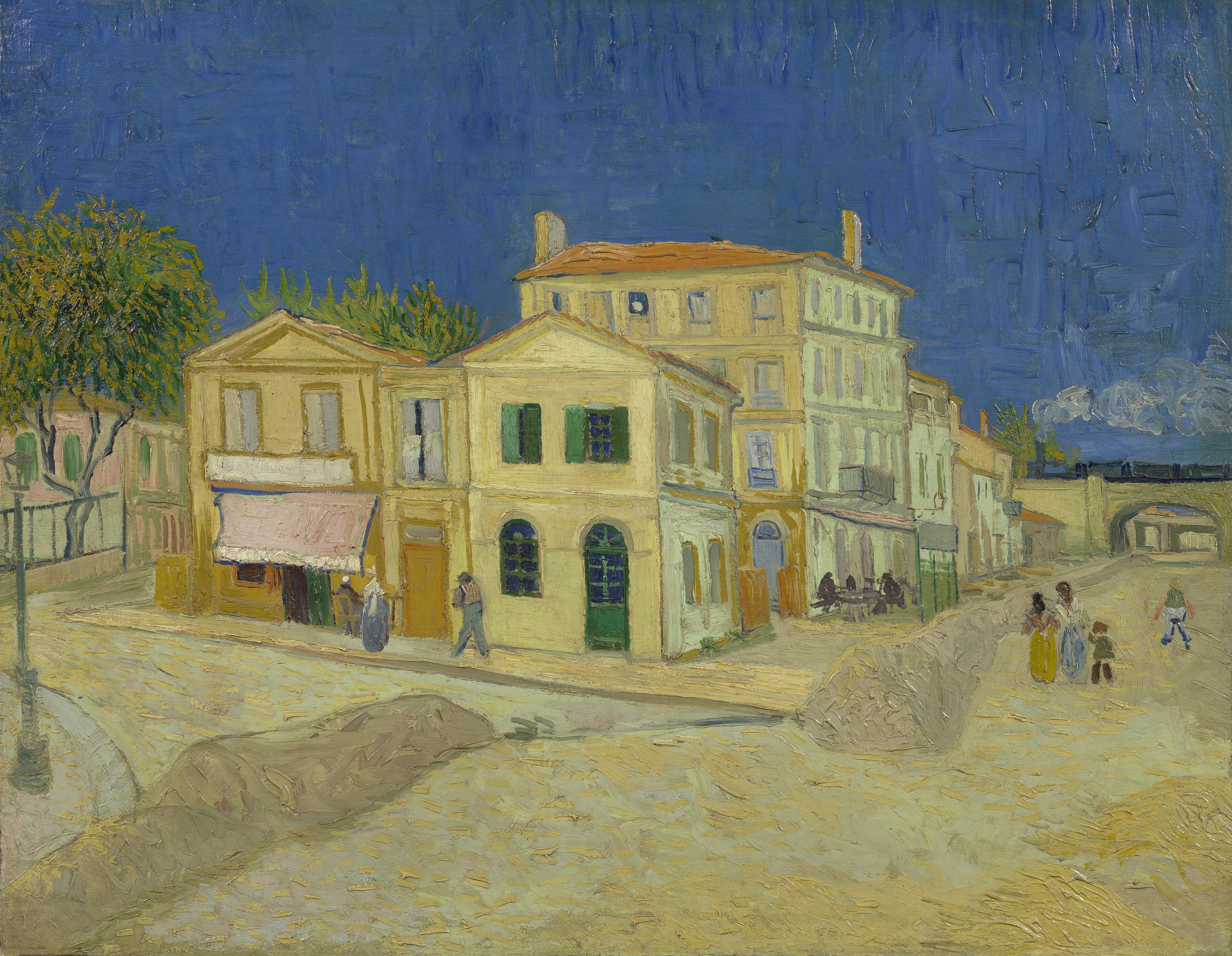
The Yellow House (1888)

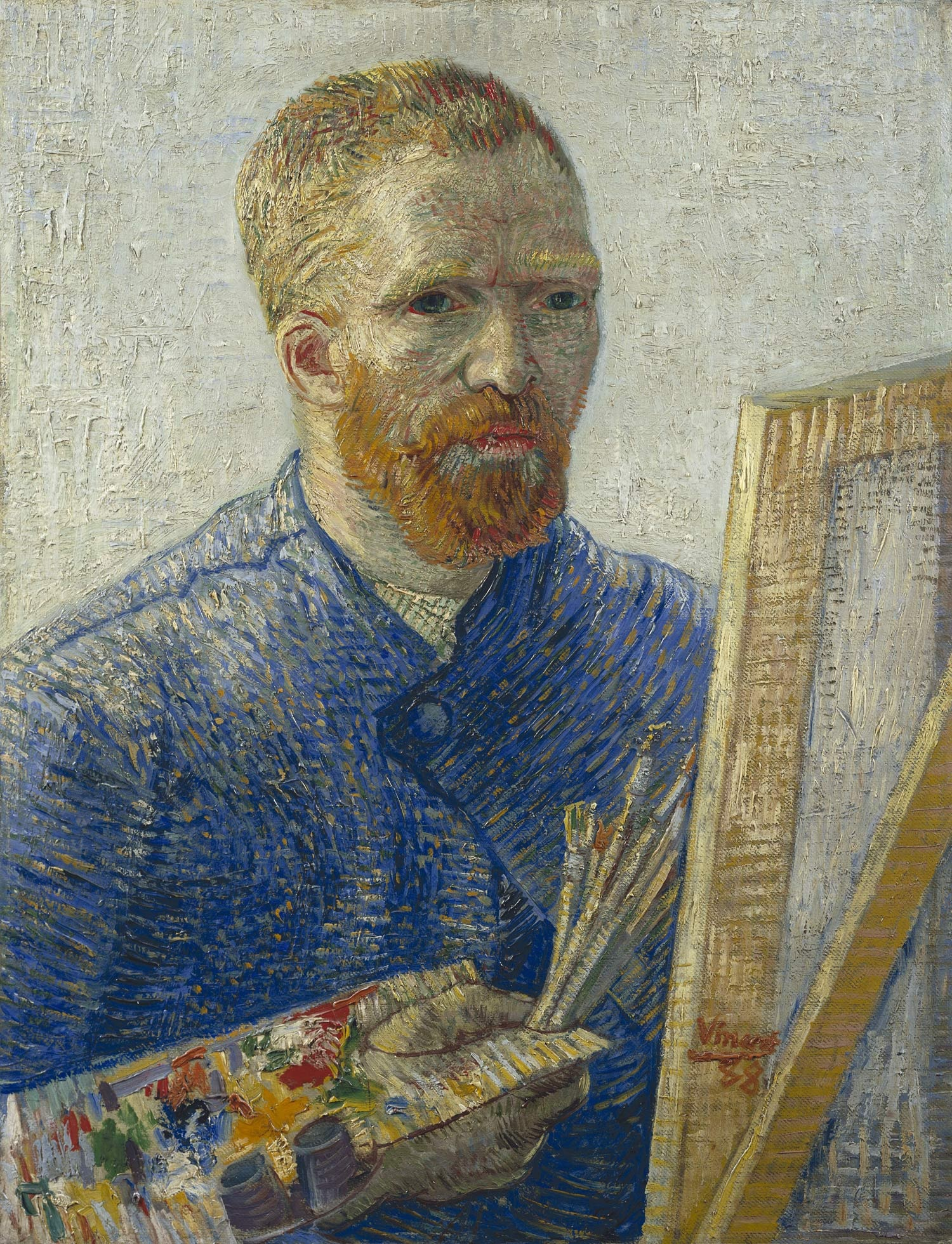
Self-portrait (1888)

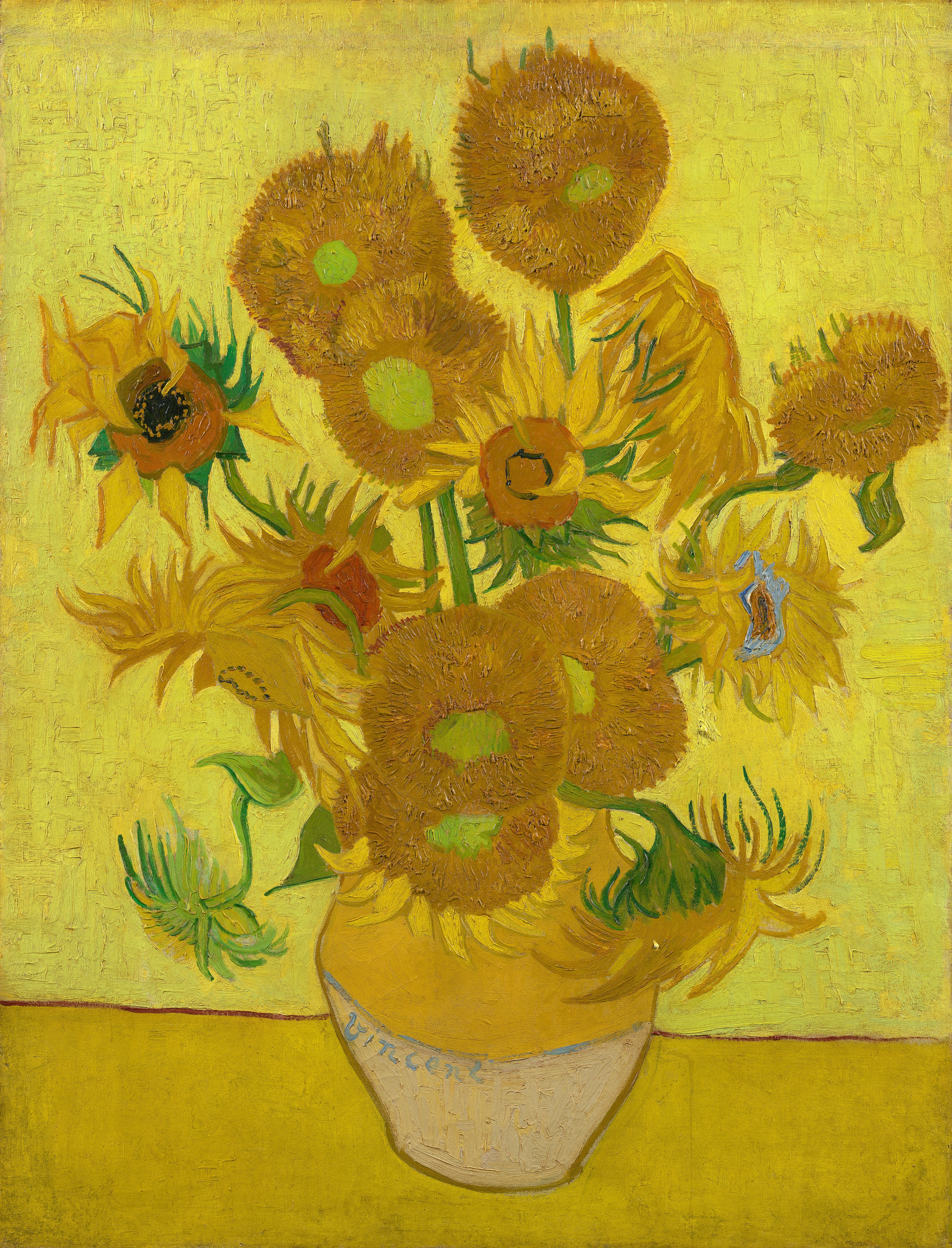
Sunflowers (1889)

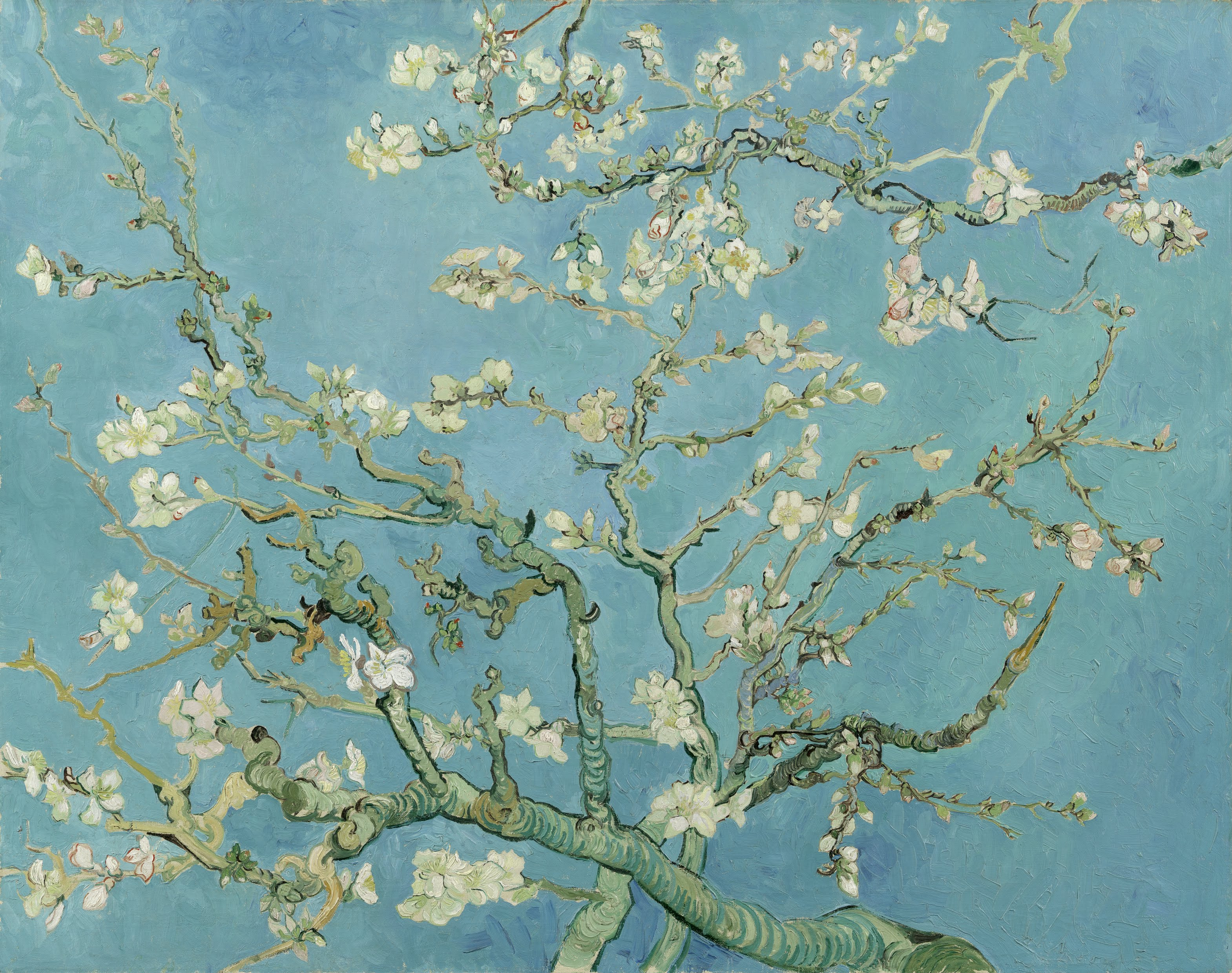
Almond Blossoms (1890)

The museum houses the largest Van Gogh collection in the world, with 200 paintings, 400 drawings, and 700 letters by the artist.

The main exhibition chronicles the various phases of Van Gogh's artistic life.

- His selected works from Nuenen (1880–1885):
  - Avenue of Poplars in Autumn (1884)
  - The Potato Eaters (1885)
- His selected works from Antwerp (1886):
  - Skull of a Skeleton with Burning Cigarette (1886)
- His selected works from Paris (1886–1888):
  - Agostina Segatori Sitting in the Café du Tambourin (1887)
  - Wheat Field with a Lark (1887)
  - View of Paris from Vincent's Room in the Rue Lepic (1887)
- His selected works from Arles (1888–1889):
  - The Zouave (1888)
  - Bedroom in Arles (1888)
  - The Yellow House (1888)
  - Sunflowers (1889)
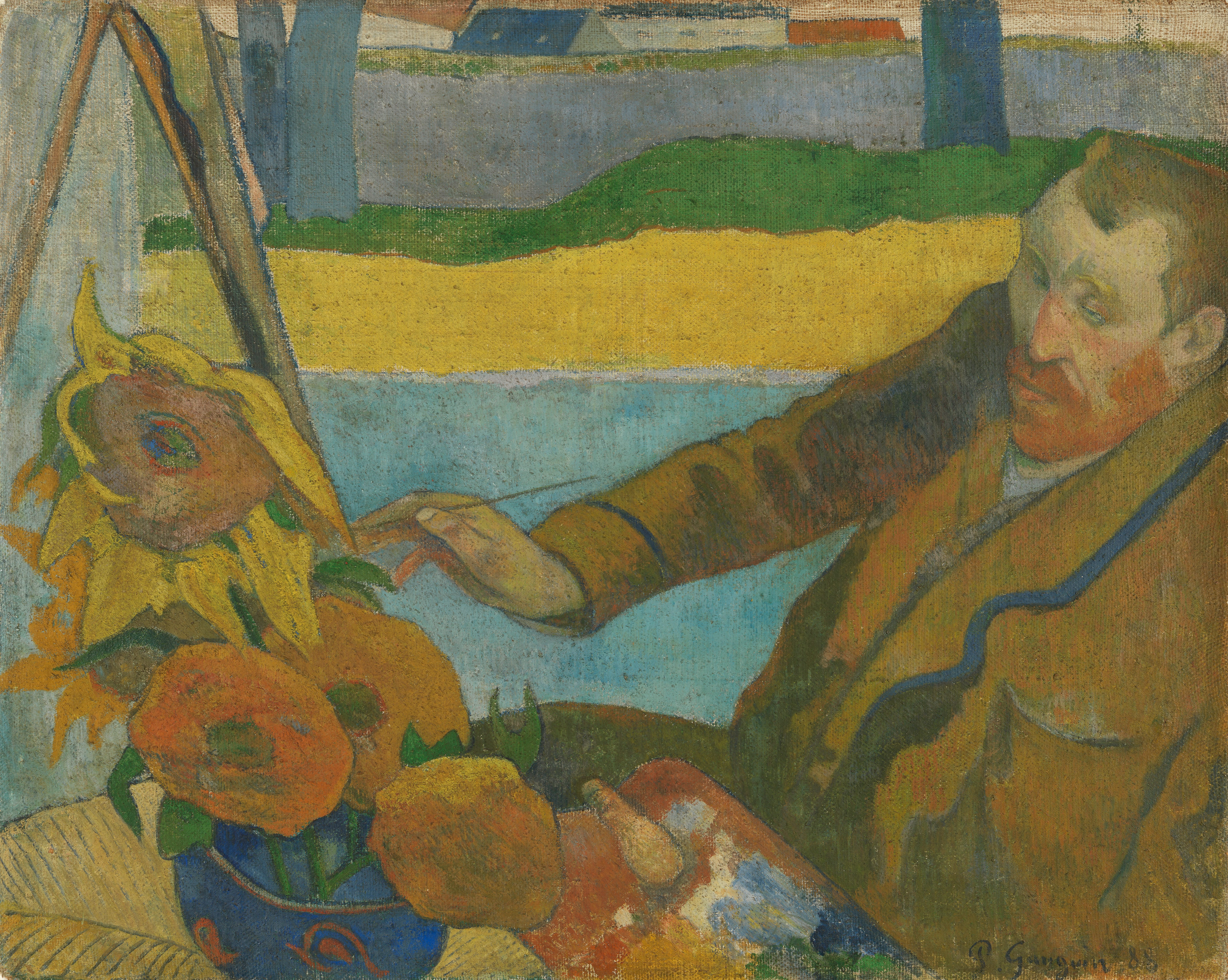
    The Painter of Sunflowers, a portrayal of Vincent van Gogh painting sunflowers by Paul Gauguin, 1888
- His selected works from Saint-Rémy (1889–1890):
  - Almond Blossoms (1890)
- And his selected works from Auvers-sur-Oise (1890):
  - Wheatfield with Crows (1890)

The permanent collection also includes nine of the artist's self-portraits and some of his earliest paintings dating back to 1882.

A newly discovered work has temporarily gone on display. Van Gogh created three unknown sketches of peasants, which were then used as a single bookmark. Stylistically, they can be dated to autumn 1881.

=== Works by contemporaries ===
The museum also features notable artworks by Van Gogh's contemporaries in the Impressionist and post-Impressionist movements and holds extensive exhibitions on various subjects from 19th Century art history.

The museum has sculptures by Auguste Rodin and Jules Dalou, and paintings by John Russell, Émile Bernard, Maurice Denis, Kees van Dongen, Paul Gauguin, Édouard Manet, Claude Monet, Odilon Redon, Georges Seurat, Paul Signac, and Henri de Toulouse-Lautrec.

== Gallery ==
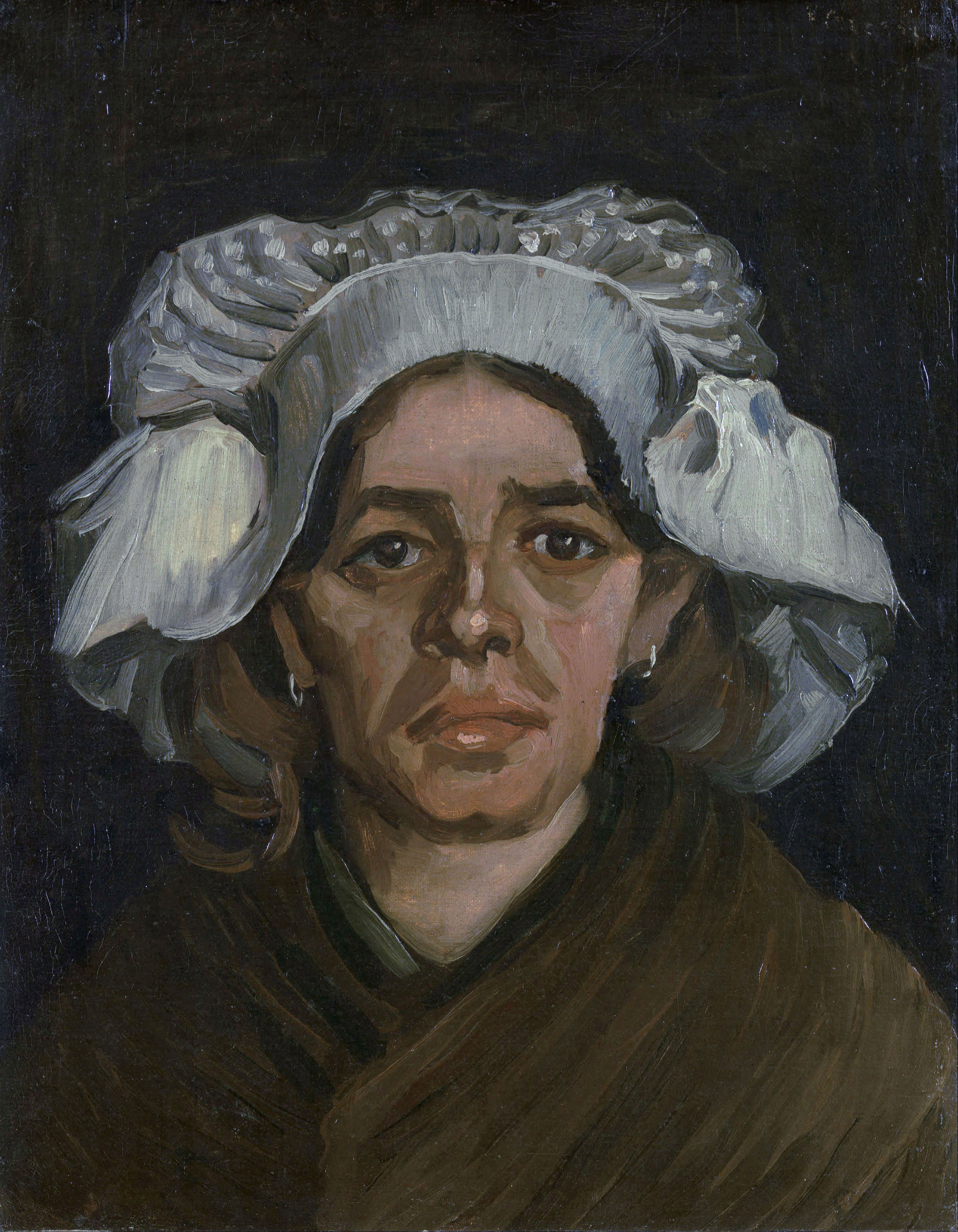
Head of a woman

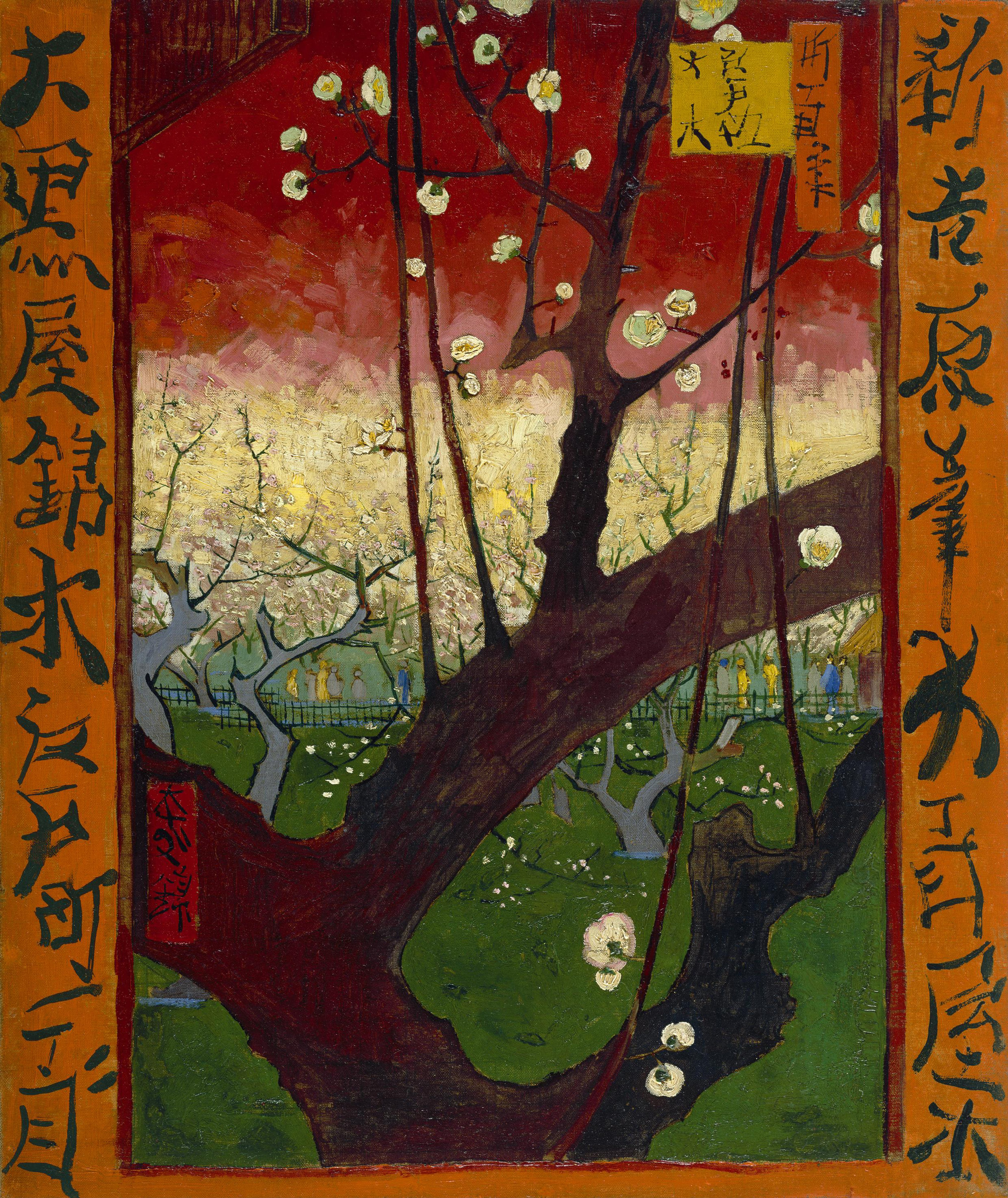
Bloeiende pruimenboomgaard

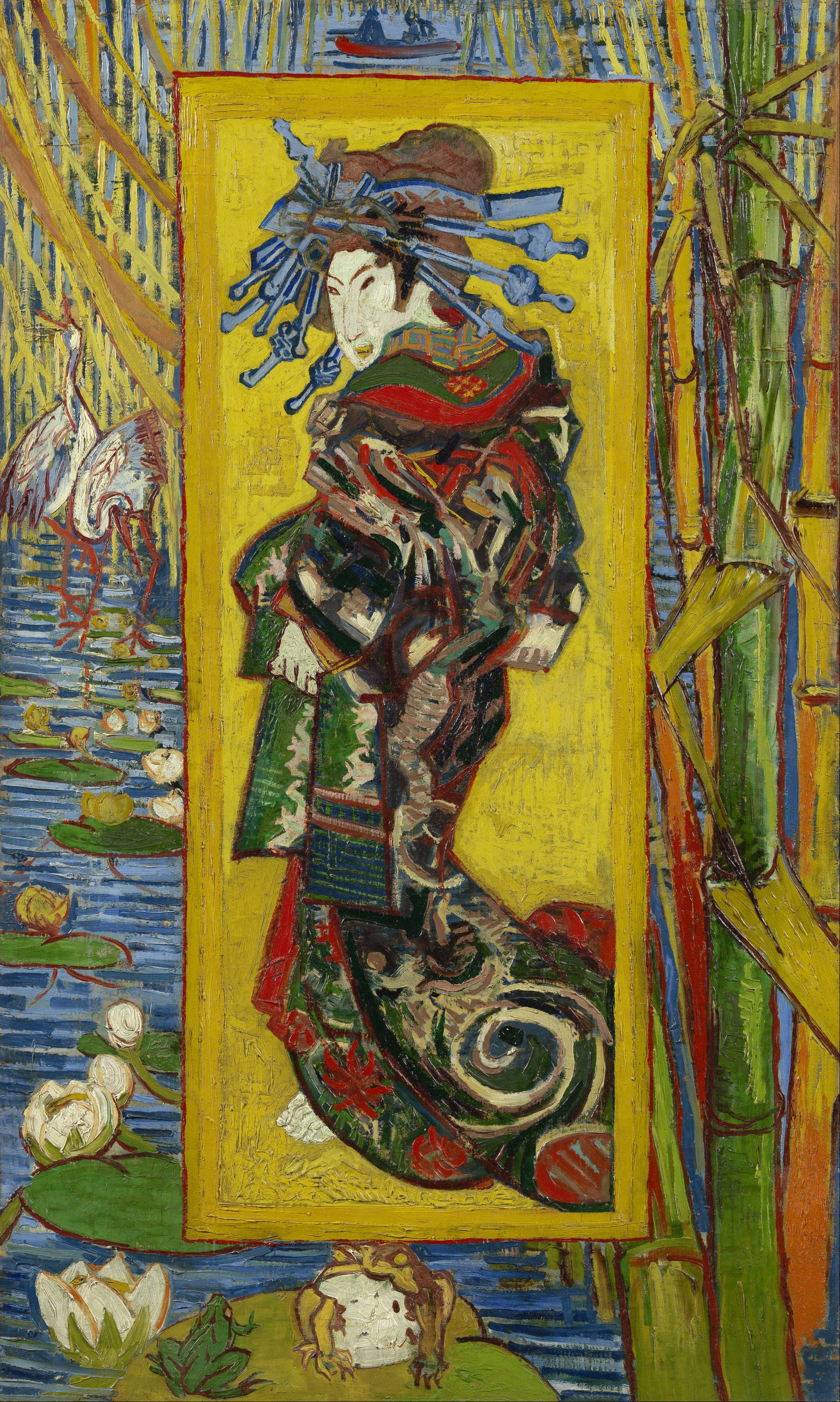
Courtesan after Eisen

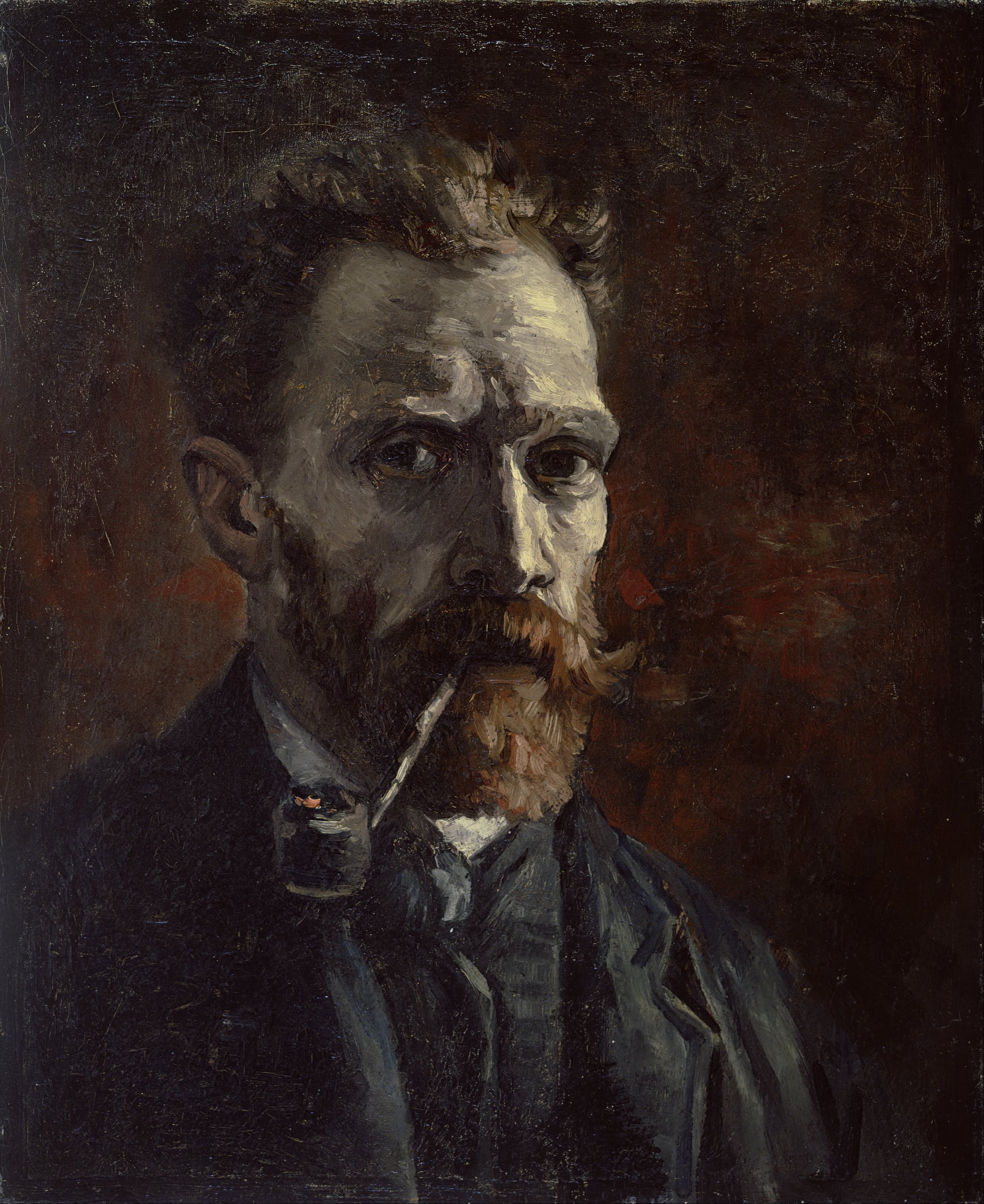
Self-portrait with pipe

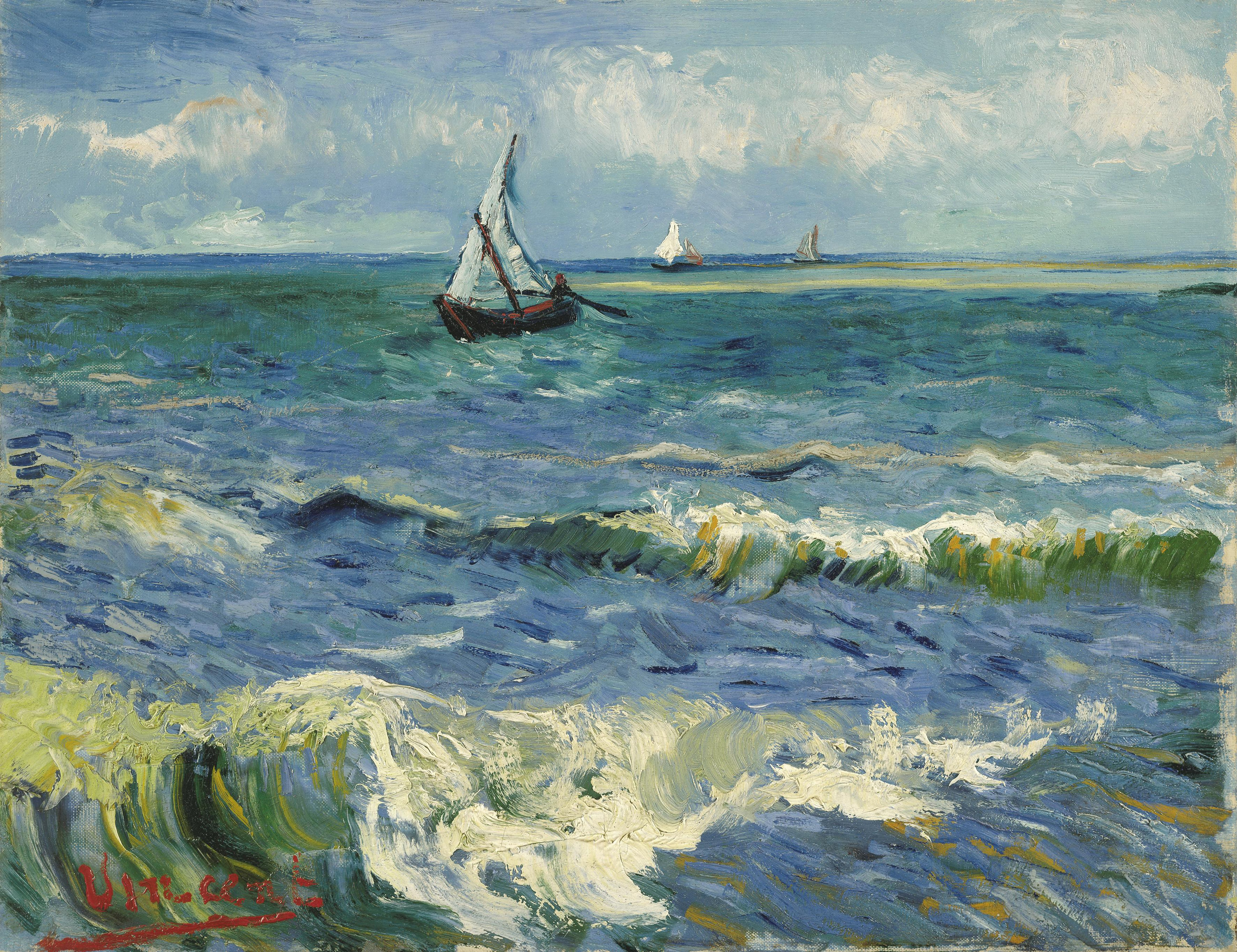
Zeegezicht bij Les Saintes-Maries-de-la-Mer

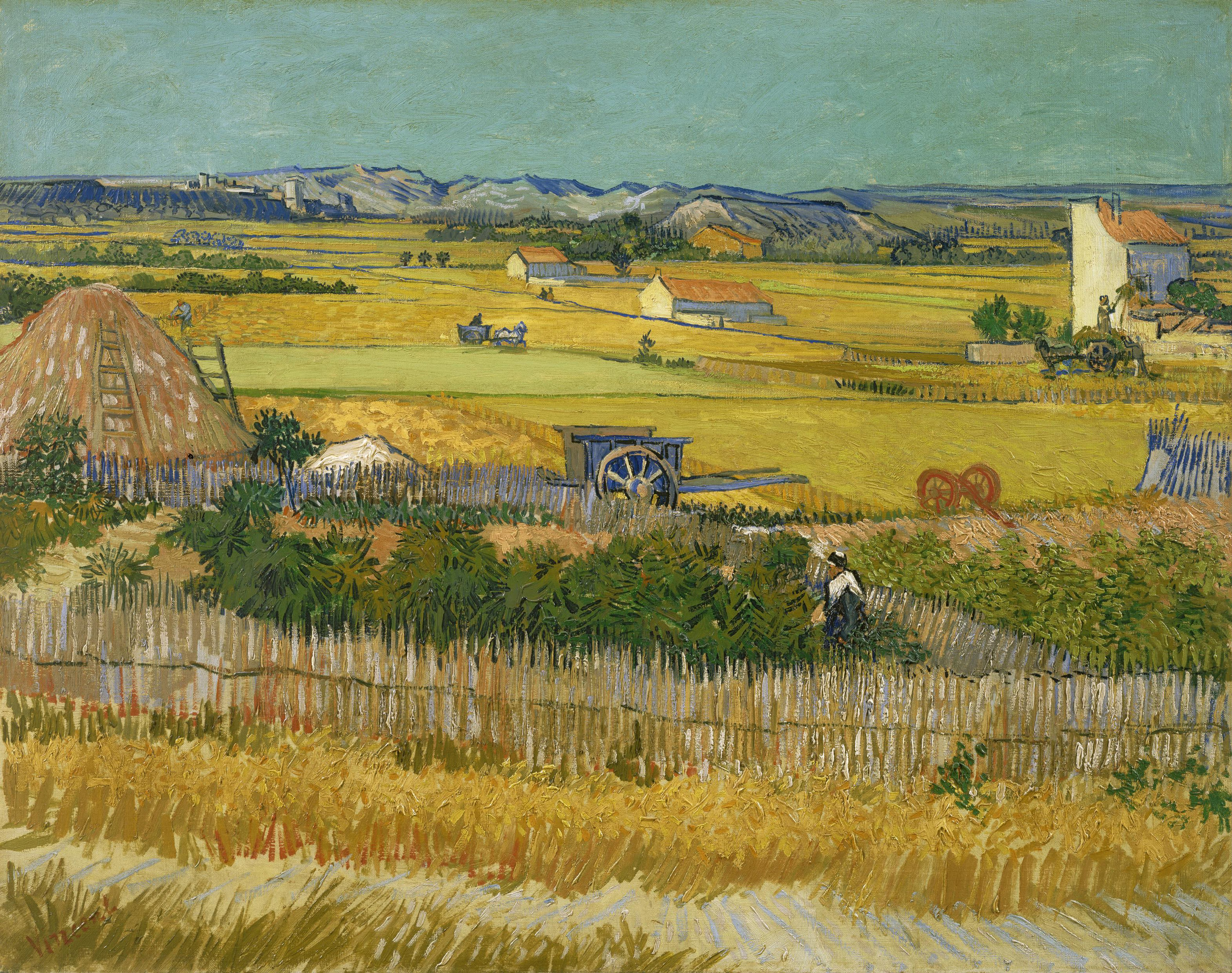
De oogst

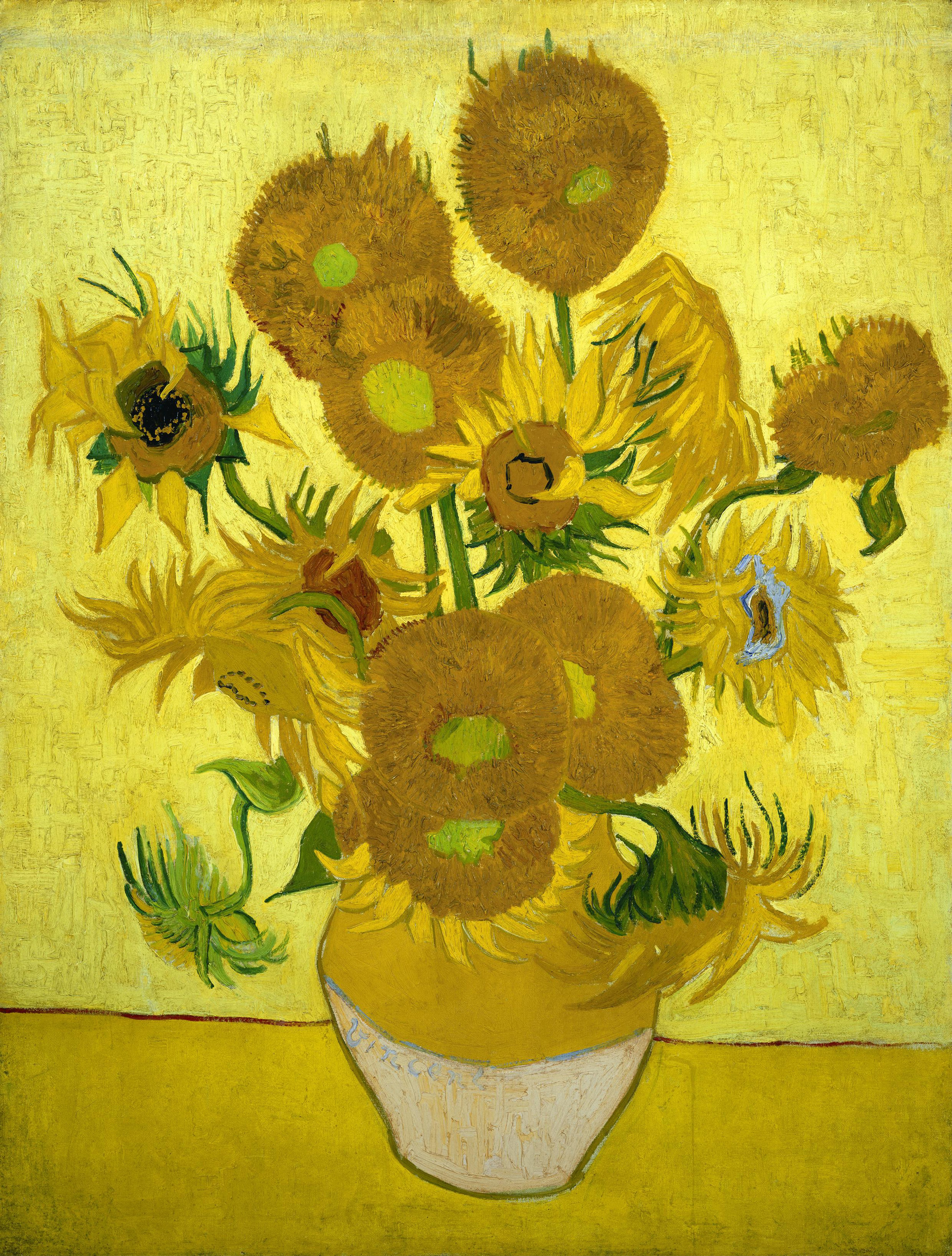
Zonnebloemen

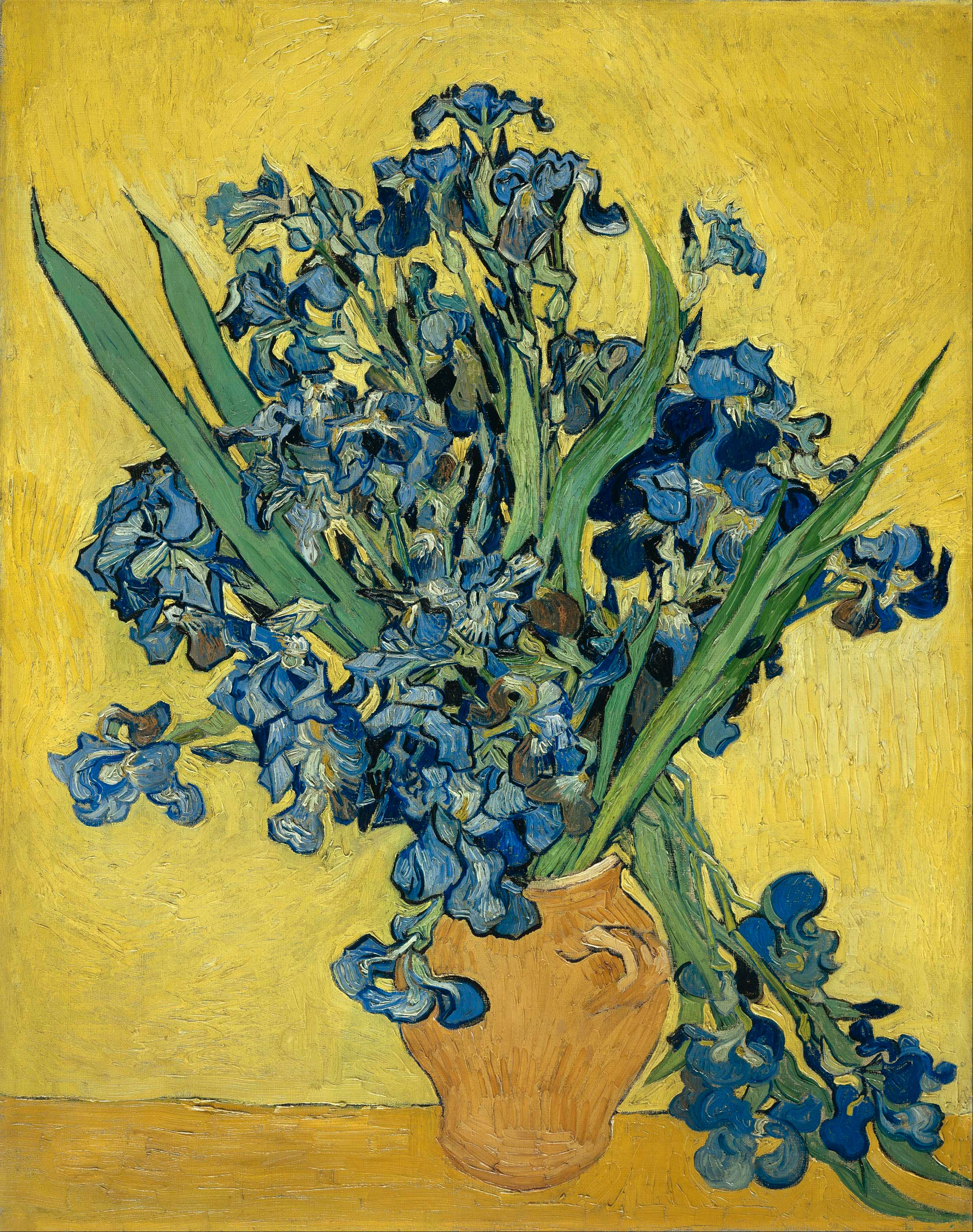
Irises

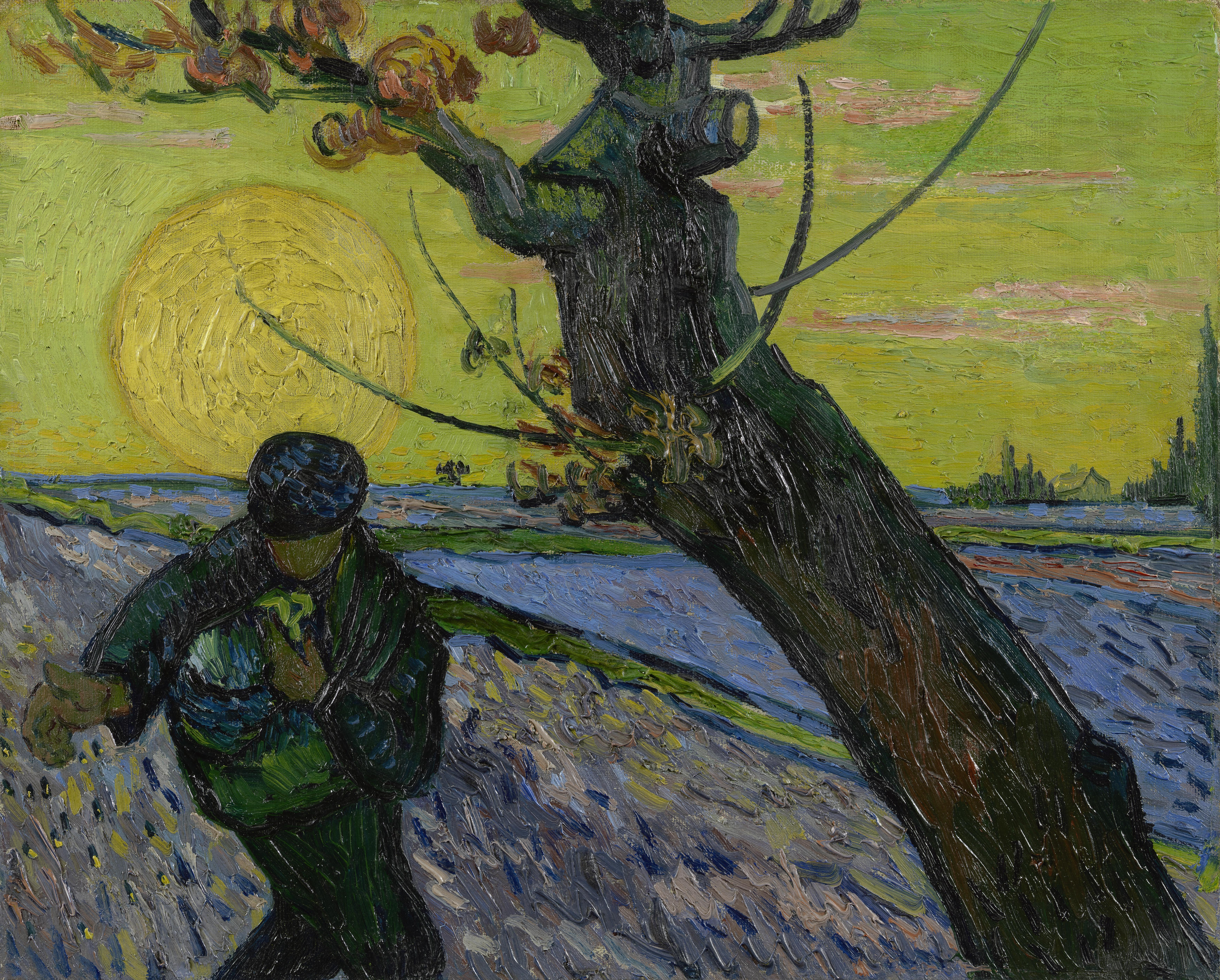
The sower

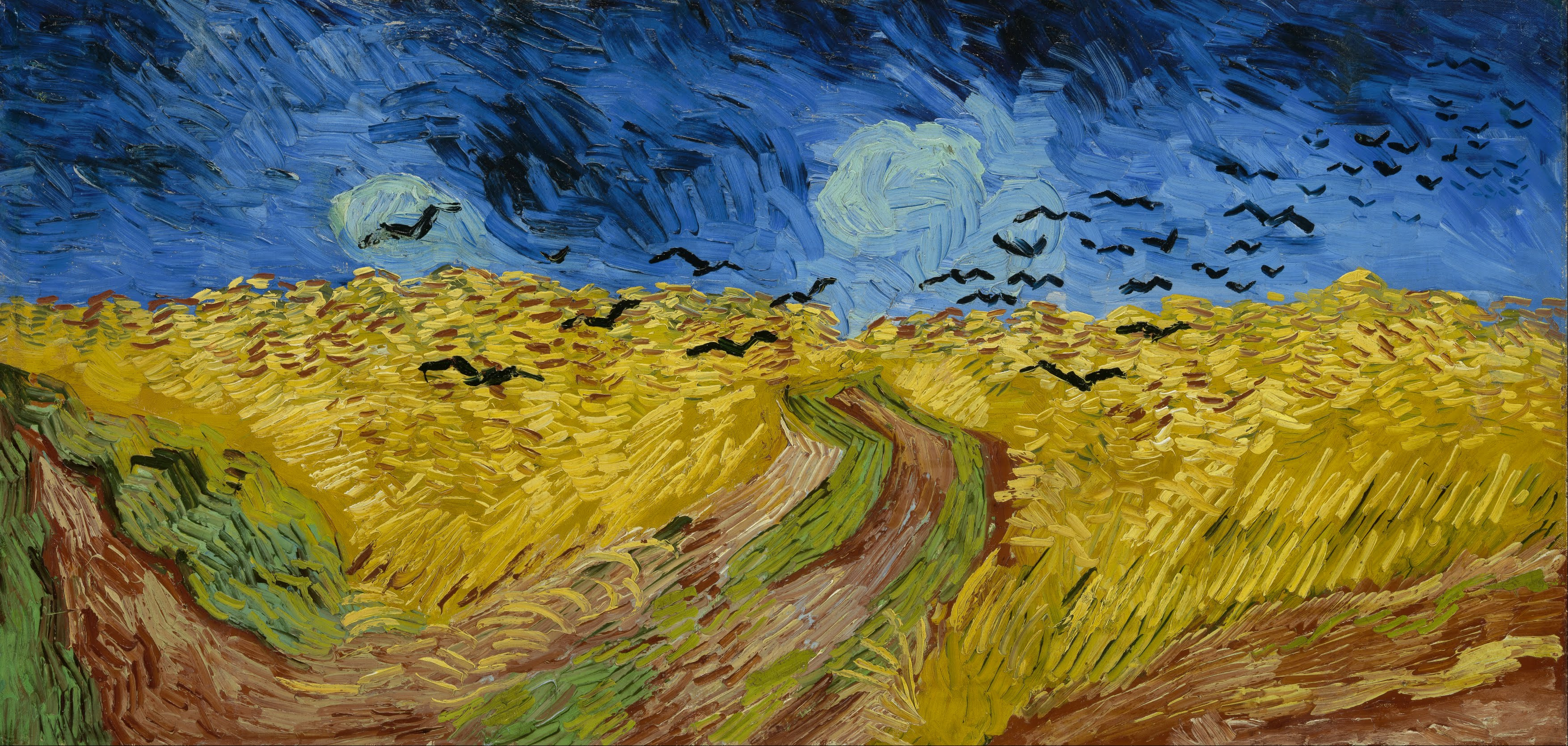
Wheatfield with crows

== Meet Vincent Van Gogh Experience ==
The Van Gogh Museum manages an official Meet Vincent Van Gogh Experience, described as a travelling "3D immersive exhibition" using technology and computer audio-visual techniques to cover the story of Van Gogh's life through images of his works. The first "experience" was in 2016 in Beijing, and it has since been toured globally to Europe, Asia and North America.

The Meet Van Gogh Experience does not present original artworks, as they are too fragile to travel. The "experience" was designed in collaboration with the London-based museum design consultancy, Event Communications (who designed Titanic Belfast), and it won a 2017 THEA award in the category of Immersive Museum Exhibit: Touring.

== Visitors ==
Year	Visitors	Year	Visitors
2000	1,312,000	2010	1,430,000
2001	1,276,000	2011	1,601,000
2002	1,593,000	2012	1,438,000
2003	1,342,000	2013	1,449,000
2004	1,338,000	2014	1,609,000
2005	1,417,000	2015	1,900,000
2006	1,677,000	2016	2,100,000
2007	1,560,000	2017	2,255,000
2008	1,474,000	2018	2,190,000
2009	1,451,000	2019	2,135,000

The Van Gogh Museum, which is a national museum (Dutch: rijksmuseum), is a foundation (Dutch: stichting).

Axel Rüger, who had been the museum director since 2006, left the museum in 2019 to become secretary and chief executive of the Royal Academy of Arts in London. The Van Gogh Museum announced that Managing Director Adriaan Dönszelmann would act as general director until a new director is appointed.

Since 2000, the museum had between 1.2 and 1.9 million visitors per year. From 2010 to 2012, it was the most visited museum in the Netherlands. In 2015, the museum had 1.9 million visitors, it was the 2nd most visited museum in the Netherlands, after the Rijksmuseum, and the 31st most visited art museum in the world.

The Van Gogh Museum is a member of the national Museumvereniging (Museum Association).

== See also ==
- Kröller-Müller Museum
- Van Gogh House
- List of single-artist museums
- List of works by Vincent van Gogh
