= View of Paris from Vincent's Room in the Rue Lepic =

1887 painting by Vincent van Gogh

View of Paris from Vincent's Room in the Rue Lepic (F341)
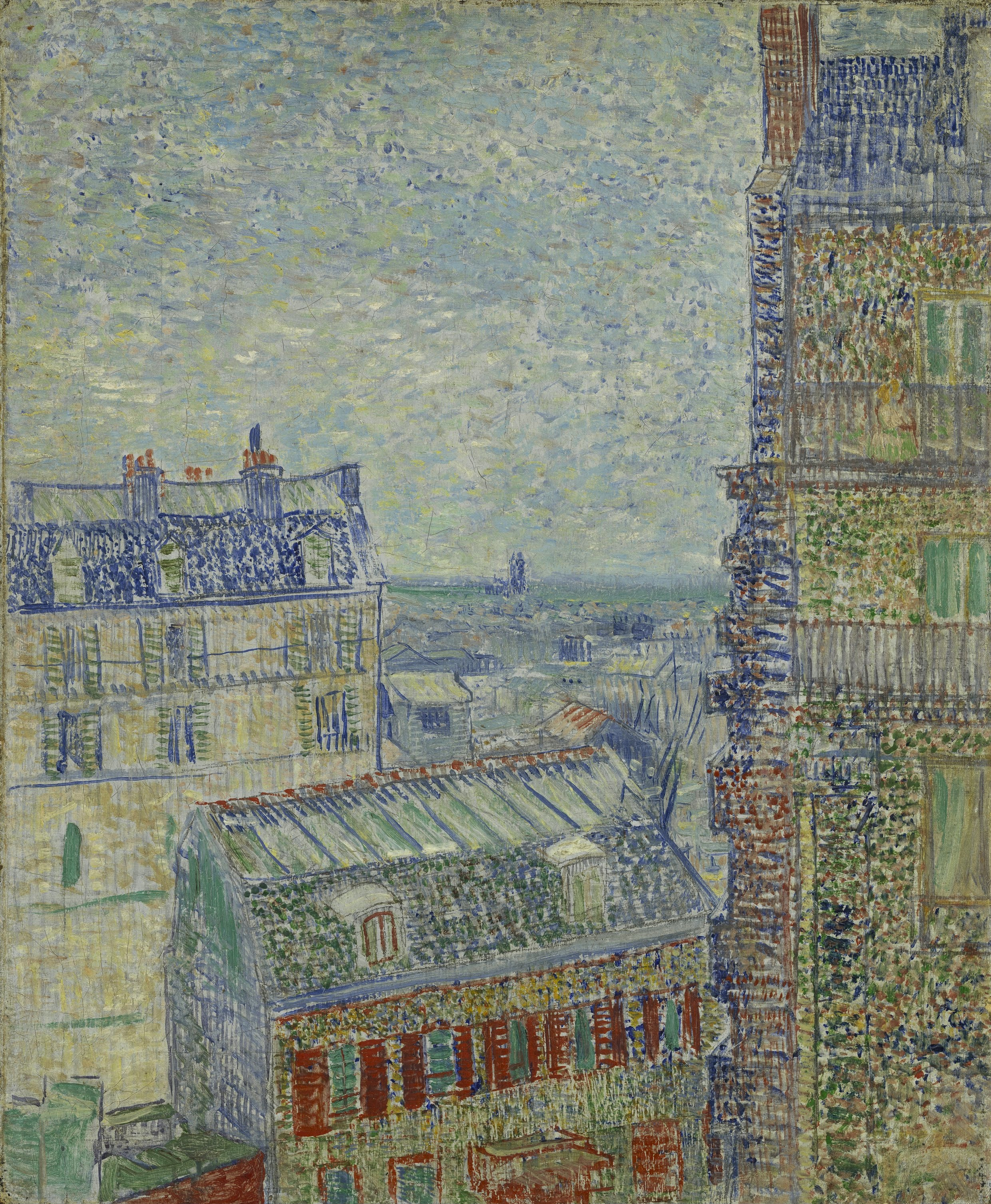
- Artist: Vincent van Gogh
- Year: 1887
- Catalogue: F341; JH1242
- Medium: Oil on canvas
- Dimensions: 46.0 cm × 38.0 cm (18.1 in × 15.0 in)
- Location: Van Gogh Museum; Amsterdam

View of Paris from Vincent's Room in the Rue Lepic (F341a)
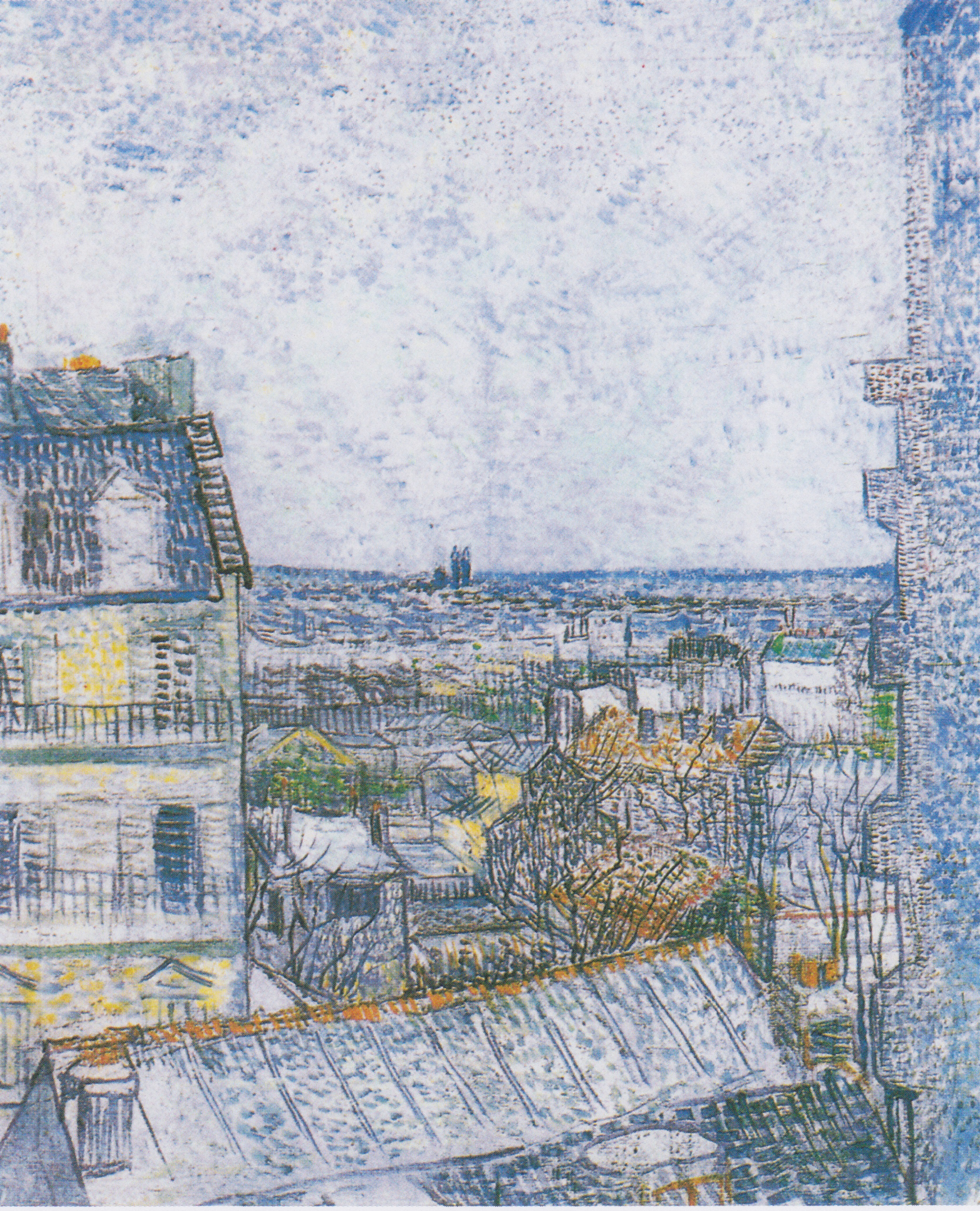
- Artist: Vincent van Gogh
- Year: 1887
- Catalogue: F341a; JH1243
- Medium: Oil on cardboard
- Dimensions: 46.0 cm × 38.2 cm (18.1 in × 15.0 in)
- Location: Private collection

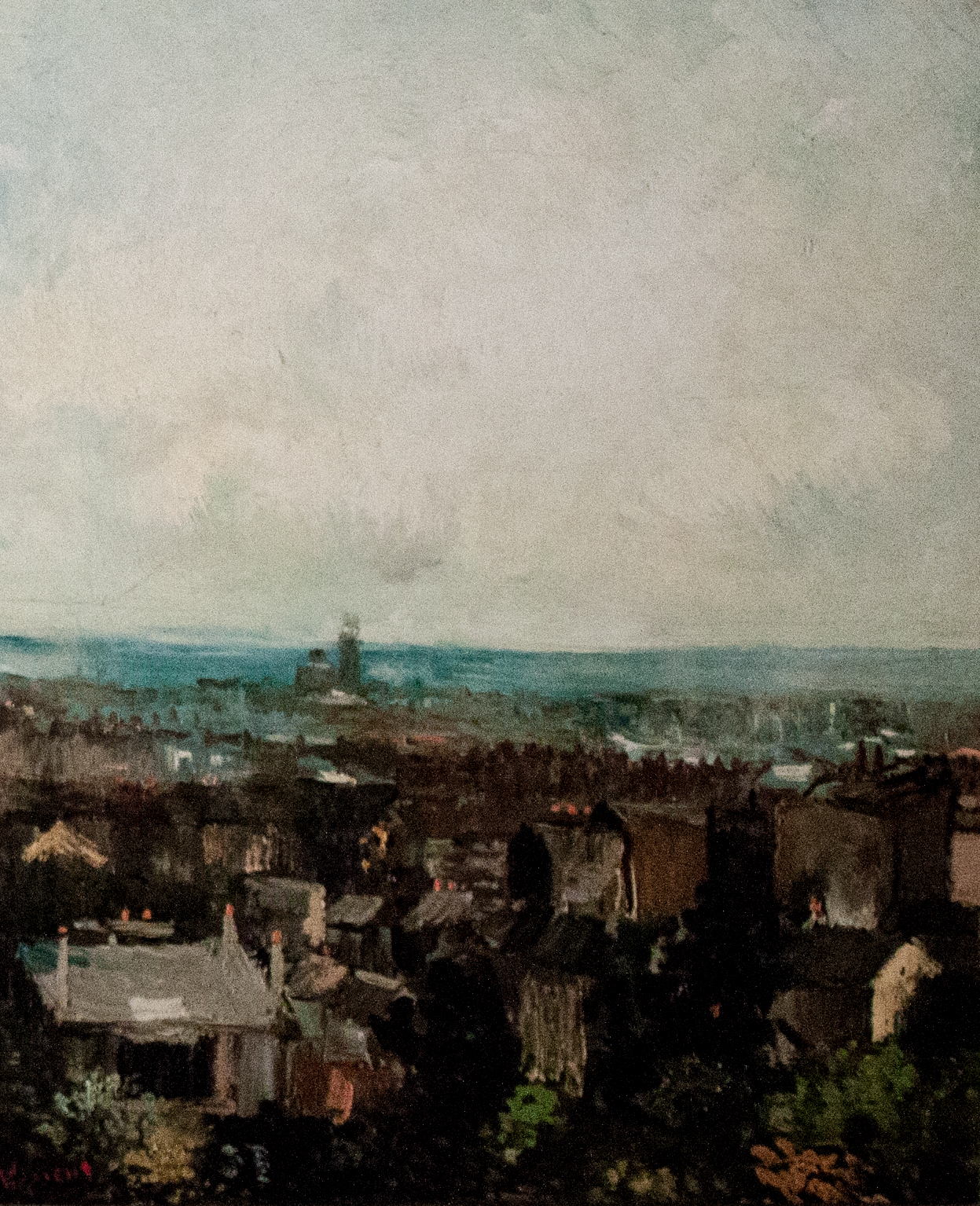
View of Rooftops- Vincent Van Gogh 1886

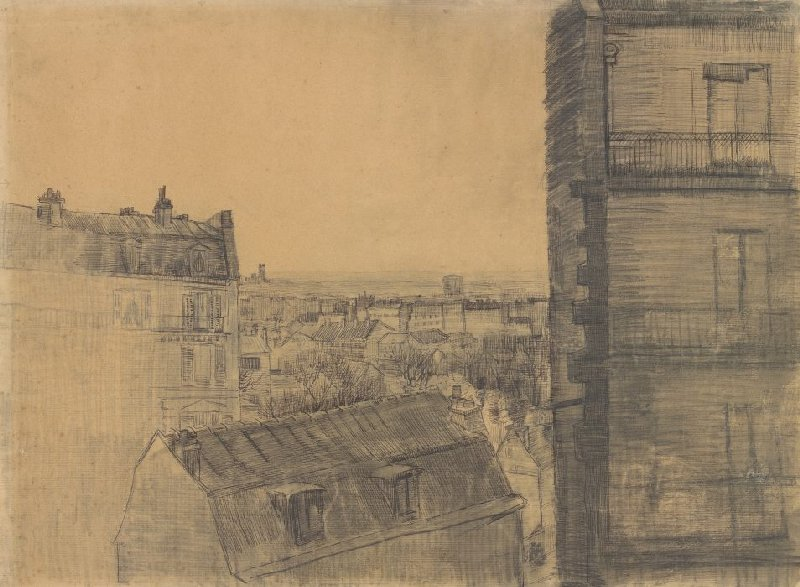
View from Apartment in Rue Lepic Drawing- Vincent van Gogh 1887

View of Paris from Vincent's Room in the Rue Lepic (Dutch: Gezicht op de daken van Parijs) is the name of two paintings by the Dutch Post-Impressionist artist Vincent van Gogh from 1887, when he lived with his brother Theo in Paris.

== Context ==
Van Gogh moved from the Netherlands to Paris in March 1886 to live with his brother, Theo, who was an art dealer. The View of Paris from Vincent's Room in the Rue Lepic was painted from Vincent and Theo's fourth-floor apartment located in Montmartre, which gave Vincent a vast view of the Paris skyline. At that time, Montmartre was known as an artist's quarter. During the two years that Van Gogh lived in Paris between 1886 and 1888, he was exposed to a vibrant art scene of young artists experimenting with new styles and his style began to evolve away from his "dark-manner Dutch works."

Living in Paris benefited Van Gogh. In October 1886, he wrote to his friend, Horace Mann Livens, "Paris is Paris, there is but one Paris and however hard living may be here... the French air clears up the brain and does one good, tremendously good." During his time in Paris, Van Gogh painted approximately 230 paintings; this constituted the most prolific period in his life.

== Composition and analysis ==
Van Gogh painted the Views of Paris from the perspective of his window in Montmartre looking toward the center of Paris. In the foreground of the composition, we see city blocks and buildings with bright and colorful shuttered windows and an array of rooftops, opening to a view of Paris in the distance with the cathedral of Notre-Dame de Paris in the city's center beneath the blue and green sky.

Both Views of Paris highlight Van Gogh's Impressionistic style at the time. The paintings are among the first works where he used loose brushwork and the bright, contrasting colors of blues, greens, reds, and yellows. He also incorporated the Pointillism technique, using small dots of color.

Van Gogh created the Views of Paris after a series of related paintings from similar vantage points. Soon after moving to his new apartment in Paris, Van Gogh painted the Roofs of Paris in 1886, from the view of his window which faced southeast. The View of Paris from Vincent's Room in the Rue Lepic is the third painting in a group of three works created by Van Gogh in 1887 from the view from his apartment. The first was a drawing followed by two paintings. While working on his initial drawing, Van Gogh realized that using a horizontal orientation would not achieve the composition he was envisioning. This along with the all too large building on the right, caused him to scrap it and start over, this time with the vertical orientation. He also switched his location to the living room window, allowing the building on the right to have a smaller space on the canvas. The change of room, the vertical orientation and the addition of a girl on the top balcony to add life to the painting, solved his compositional issues and resulted in the second painting, View of Paris from Vincent's Room in the Rue Lepic. He then painted a third where he shrunk the size of the building even more, painted under the same name. He then painted another study in oils.

== Stylistic evolution ==
Van Gogh's style and use of color evolved while living in Paris. His work shifted from the dark, somber hues of his earlier realist paintings to more colorful and textured art. For example, in his earlier work, View From Rooftops in Paris, painted from his apartment in Paris, Van Gogh used a much darker color palette of mostly grays and browns. In his later Views of Paris, we see the transition to the use of more vibrant colors and the pointillist brush technique.

== Influences ==
The Views of Paris were influenced by Japanese prints, which were often of distant views with large objects in the foreground. In the Views of Paris, Van Gogh similarly places buildings and rooftops in the foreground and the view of Paris and the sky in the distance.

Van Gogh was also influenced by the Impressionist and Neo-Impressionist movements. He was especially inspired by other young artists like Camille Pissarro, Paul Gauguin, Henri de Toulouse-Lautrec as well as the art critic Charles Blanc, all of whom pushed him to use color for its luminous and emotional effect.

== See also ==
- List of works by Vincent van Gogh
