= Wheat Field with a Lark =

1887 painting by Vincent van Gogh

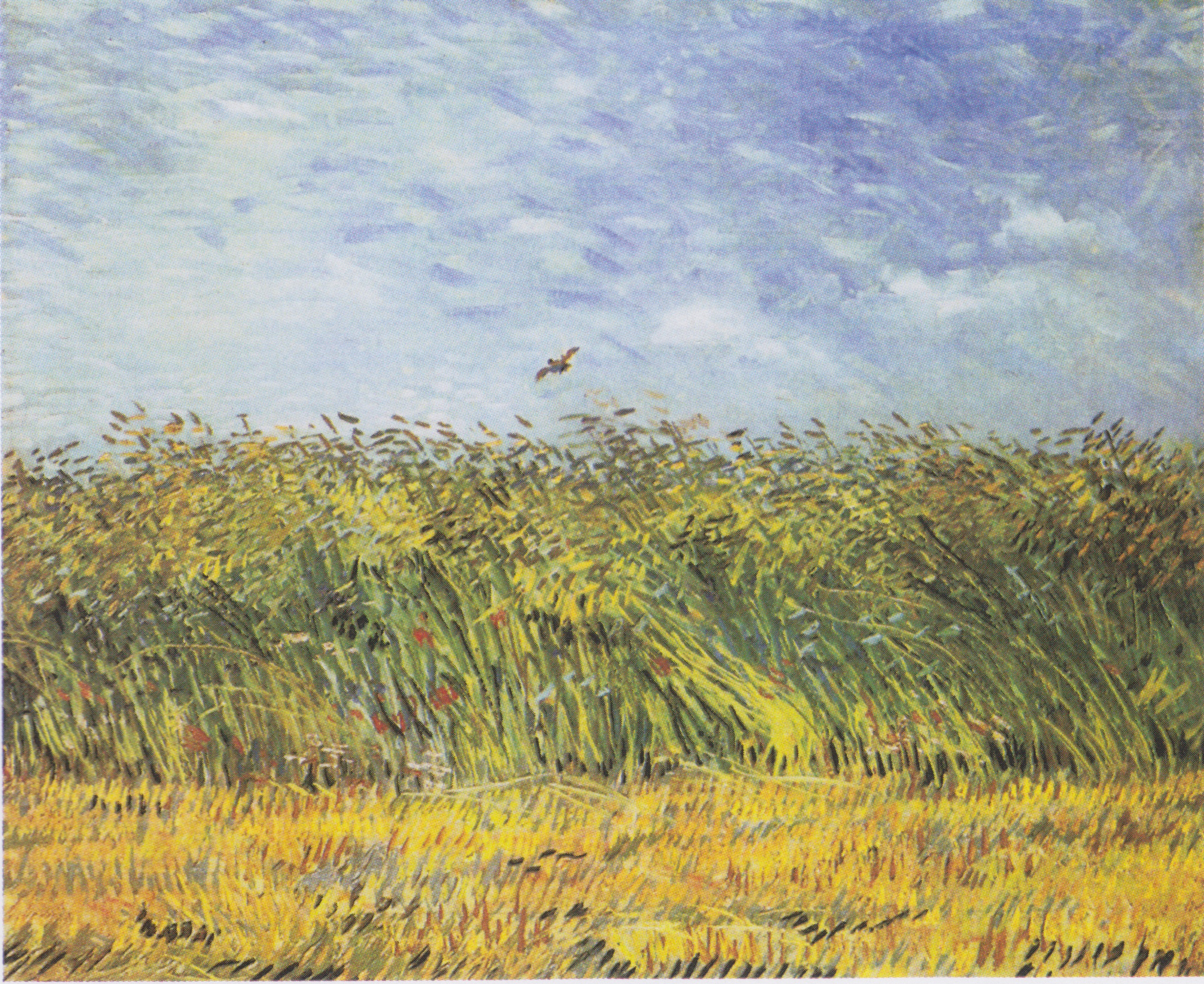
- Artist: Vincent van Gogh
- Year: 1887
- Catalogue: F310; JH1274
- Medium: Oil on canvas
- Dimensions: 53.7 cm × 65.2 cm (21.1 in × 25.7 in)
- Location: Van Gogh Museum; Amsterdam

In 1887, while he was residing in Paris, Vincent van Gogh executed an oil painting commonly known as Wheat Field with a Lark. It is housed in the Van Gogh Museum in Amsterdam, where it is known as Korenveld met patrijs (English: Wheat field with partridge).

Its lower half shows a partially harvested field of wheat under a sky patterned with light clouds. Poppies and cornflowers wave in the wind alongside the crop. A lark takes flight towards the upper left of the canvas.

== See also ==
- List of works by Vincent van Gogh
