= Meadows near Rijswijk and the Schenkweg =

Location painted by Vincent van Gogh

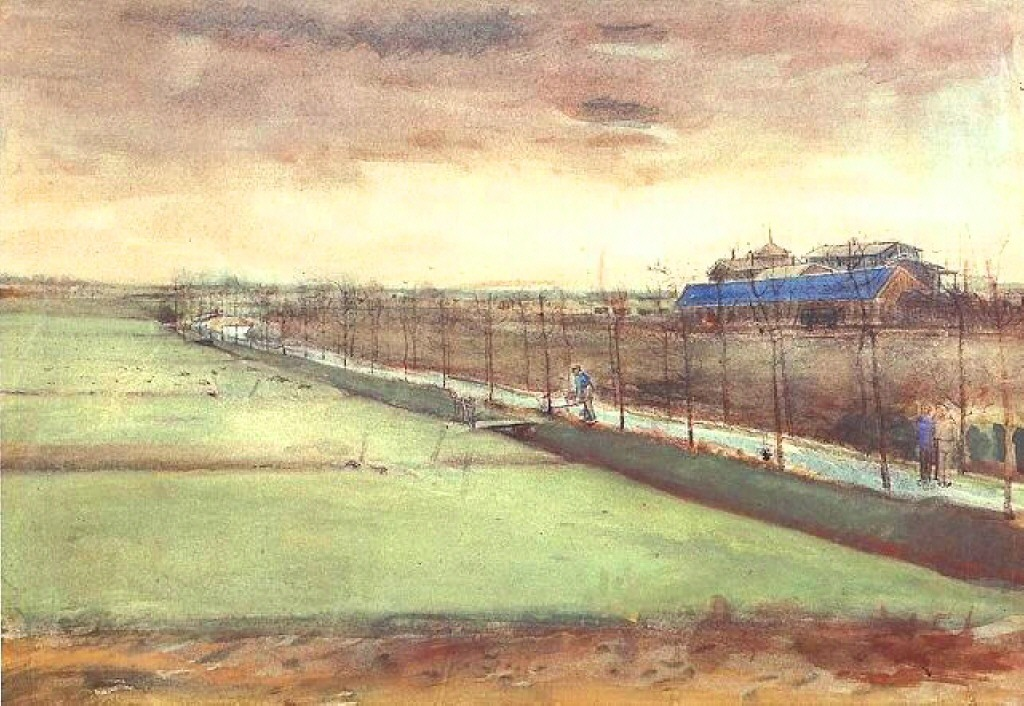
- Artist: Vincent van Gogh
- Year: 1882 (January)
- Catalogue: F910, JH99
- Type: watercolor
- Dimensions: 38 cm × 56 cm (15.0 in × 22.0 in)
- Location: Private collection, London

Meadows near Rijswijk and the Schenkweg is a watercolor by the Dutch painter Vincent van Gogh that he made in January 1882, shortly after taking up residence in The Hague.

It shows the view from his studio window on the outer reaches of The Hague at the Schenkweg, then undergoing a period of urban development. The view is across the Schenkweg ditch towards the newly constructed Rijnspoor railway station, built for the Utrecht-Gouda-The Hague railway, and now the Den Haag Centraal railway station. Rijswijk was then a small rural community to the south, bordering Delft but stretching all the way to The Hague. The land on which the Rijnspoor was built was ceded to The Hague by Rijswijk. It is now a suburb of The Hague.

The painting is amongst the very first paintings by van Gogh. Although he had been drawing for many years and occasionally applied watercolor washes, he did not take up painting proper until his study visit to his cousin-in-law and mentor Anton Mauve at The Hague in December 1881.

== Background ==
At the end of August 1881, van Gogh visited his cousin-in-law Anton Mauve, a noted and successful painter and a leading member of the Hague School, and showed him some studies and drawings he had made. Mauve encouraged him and suggested that he now start painting. At the end of the following November, van Gogh returned to the Hague for a month to take painting lessons from Mauve, during which time he saw him almost daily.

He returned to his family home in Etten at Christmas with the intention of setting up a studio there, but quarreled disastrously with his father, a pastor, over his refusal to attend church on Christmas Day. This, in turn, was a consequence of his bitterness over his spurned love for his widowed cousin Kee Vos Stricker that had led to so much family tension that year. He left home that same Christmas Day and returned to The Hague, resolved to set up his studio there.

== At Schenkweg ==
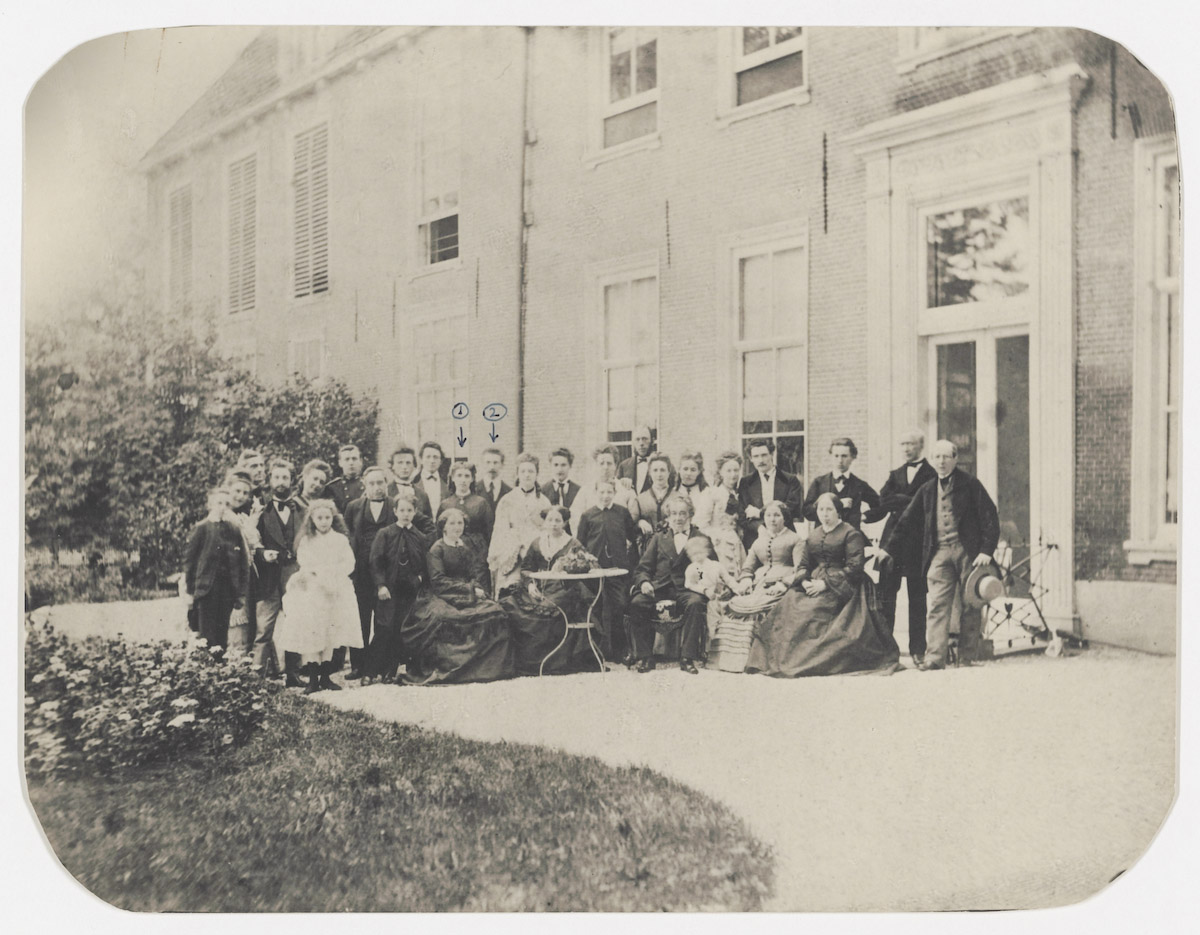
80th birthday celebration of van Gogh's great-uncle Johannes Andricus Stricker, c. August 1872.

The Schenkweg lay a little less than a mile to the east of the centre of The Hague. At that time it was open countryside, a polder reclaimed in medieval times, but the land was increasingly being sold for development. These new developments were cheaply constructed, and they attracted a less affluent class of people. Today the urban conurbation extends a further three miles east, although there remains an extensive park and woodlands just north of the Schenkweg called the Haagse Bos, one of the last remaining stretches of ancient forest in the Netherlands, where van Gogh painted some early studies in August 1882.

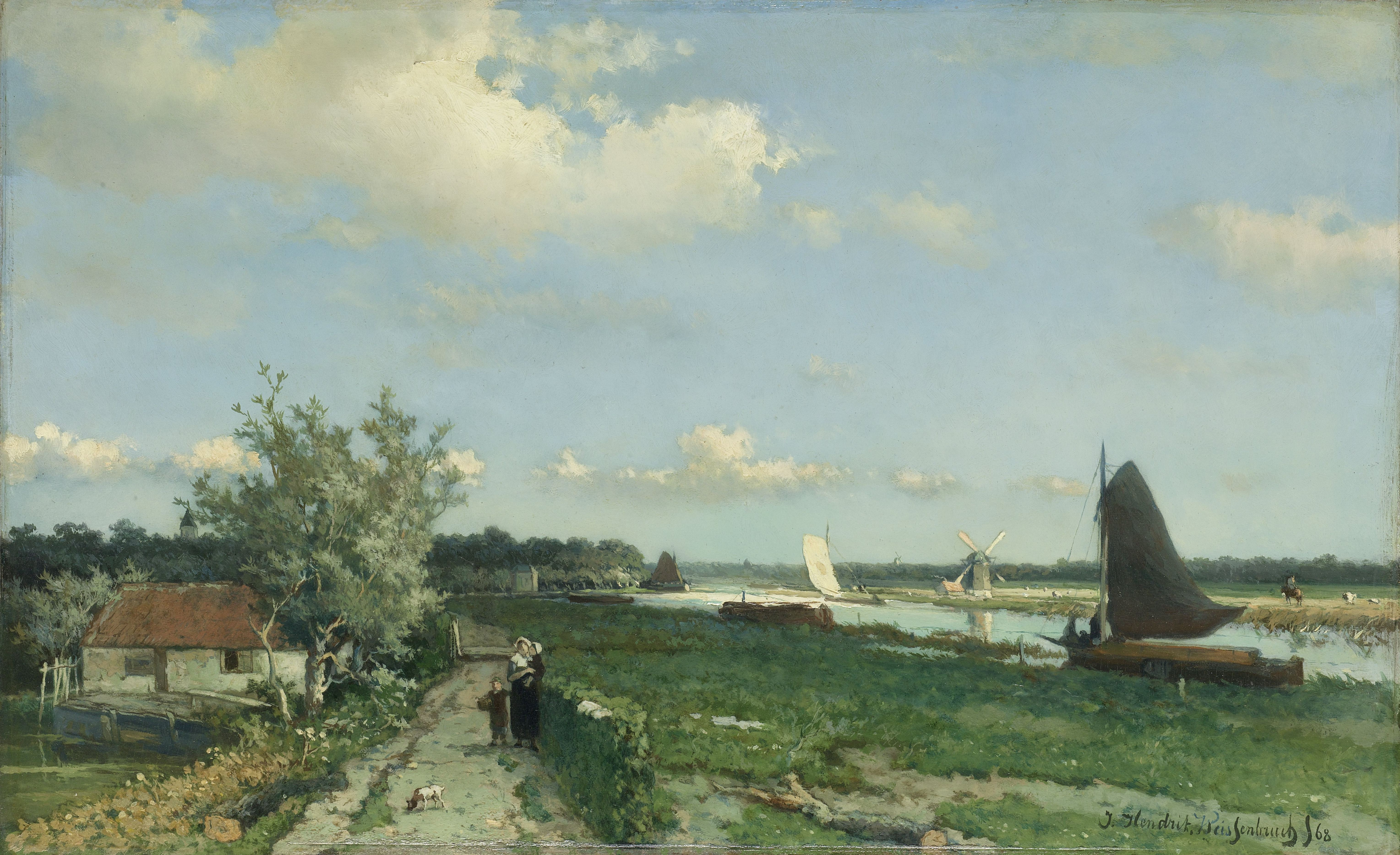
Johan Hendrik Weissenbruch – The Shipping Canal at Rijswijk, oil on panel, 1868. Weissenbruch was a contemporary and early champion of van Gogh.

Van Gogh was familiar with the meadows at Rijswijk. An aunt of his cousin Kee Vos Stricker lived at the Huis te Hoorn in Rijswijk, and van Gogh was a frequent guest of the family when he was working at the art dealership Goupil & Co., whose Hague branch his uncle Cent, Vincent van Gogh (a namesake), had helped found. On one such occasion he walked into Rijswijk with his brother Theo, probably to attend the 80th birthday party of his great-uncle Johannes Andricus Stricker. The walk seems to have cemented his relationship with his younger brother as he often subsequently referred to it in his letters. Evidently they discussed the possibility of becoming painters together. The family photo taken at the time (right) is said to include both Vincent and Theo, as well as their cousin Kee Vos Stricker and the Haanebeek sisters, Caroline and Annet, for which Vincent and Theo harboured unrequited youthful loves respectively.

=== Studio ===
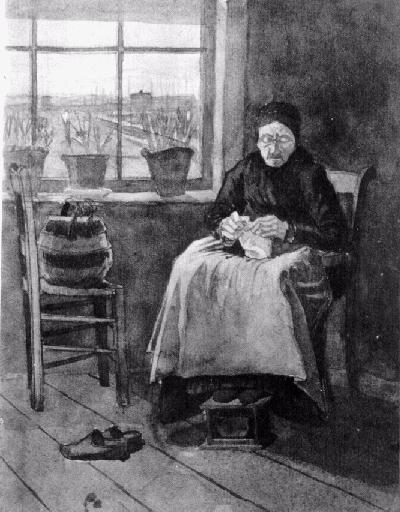
Woman Knitting Near a Window, watercolor, January 1882, location unknown (F910a, JH90). Note the view from the window and the pots of flowers on the window sill. The painting belonged to Tersteeg, whose support for van Gogh at this time was so equivocal and eventually outrightly hostile.

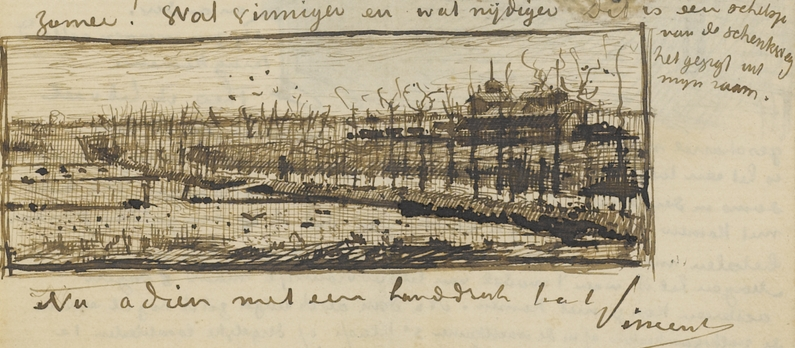
Sketch of the view from his studio window in letter 200 (F-, JH930).

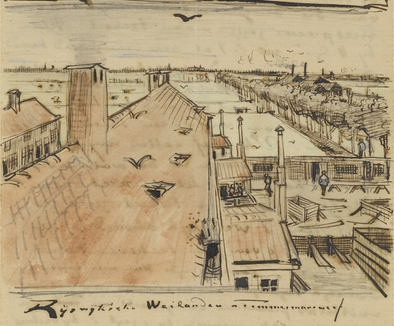
Sketch of Roofs Seen from the Artist's Attic Window (below) in letter 251 (F-, JH157).

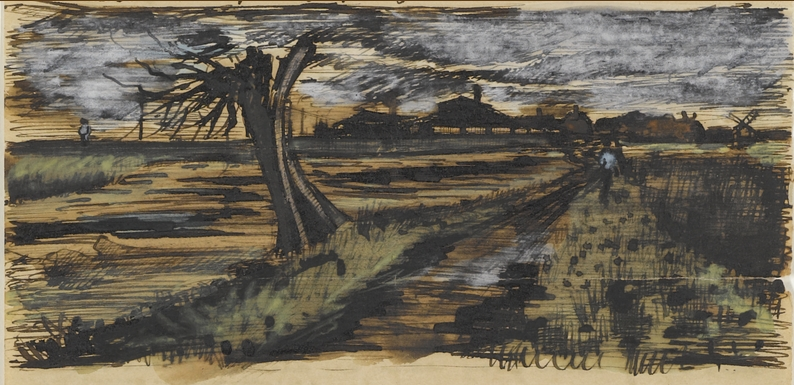
Sketch of Pollard Willow (below) in letter 252 (F-, JH165).

Van Gogh rented his studio at 136 Schenkweg, about 10 minutes walk from Mauve's studio at Uilebomen 198 (now the Boomsluiterskade). The studio was actually on a side street, called the Schenkstraat, off the Schenkweg. The Rijnspoor station lay about a quarter mile to the north-west. Today there are railway tracks coming up from the south into the station from Amsterdam, but these were laid much later in the 1970s when the Centraal station was constructed. In van Gogh's time the only tracks came into the station from the east from Utrecht, and he would have had an uninterrupted walk to Mauve.

Van Gogh wrote that the studio faced "more or less" south. It follows that the view in Meadows near Rijswijk and the Schenkweg was from the back window facing north, which would indeed have been where van Gogh would have posed his models for preference, as artists prefer the light from the north because it is more constant.

The studio cost 7 guilders a month to rent, and Mauve lent van Gogh 100 guilders to furnish it, insisting he had to have a bed. Van Gogh decorated the studio with his own studies, with prints from a complete set of The Graphic between 1870 and 1880 that he had acquired at a bargain price, and with flowers and a couple of boxes of bulbs. He declared himself happy and content with the result. Nevertheless, the accommodation was of the simplest kind. Arnold Pomerans remarked that it was the beginning of a long series of plainly furnished rooms, of which the Bedroom in Arles would eventually become a world-famous symbol.

Van Gogh used his studio to draw from models, either directly at the studio or for finishing sketches he called "scratches" that he made on the street and in other locations, including especially the Geest, a working-class district in The Hague. In these expeditions he often accompanied his contemporary George Hendrik Breitner, although Breitner's subject was the city itself rather than the figure.

Mauve had introduced van Gogh to the Pulchri Studio, The Hague's leading art society. As an associate member van Gogh had the right to draw from the figure two evenings a week, but he appears to have made scant use of this facility. Instead he relied on a stream of models he found in such places as soup kitchens and almshouses, spending on them a significant part of the allowance Theo sent him. Amongst these models were his mistress Sien Hoornik, model for Sorrow, and Adrianus Jacobus Zuyderland, model for At Eternity's Gate. His obsessive insistence on drawing from models brought him into conflict with both Mauve and his influential patron Hermanus Tersteeg, head of The Hague's branch of Goupil he had once worked for. Mauve visited the studio at the end of January, and his subsequent coolness towards van Gogh appears to have stemmed from that visit, made awkward by the unexpected arrival of one of van Gogh's models.

Later that year, in July, in anticipation of marrying Sien, as well as wanting a bigger studio so that he could position himself further away from his models, he moved into more spacious accommodation next door at a rent of 12.50 guilders a month. That winter, Sien's mother moved in and van Gogh's relationship with Sien, never easy, sharply deteriorated. In September 1883, at his brother's urging, he left Sien for Drenthe, putting an end to what was to prove the only domestic relationship he ever enjoyed and for which he had yearned.

Both his studios at Schenkweg can be seen in Houses at Schenkweg (below) in the block of houses extending to the right side of the drawing: "His first studio was in the somewhat higher building with the four doors and was on the left-hand side of the upper floor. His second apartment, into which he moved in July 1882, was on the upper floor to the left of the first one." The whole area has since been extensively redeveloped. There is a commemorative plaque in the Hendrick Hamelstraat at 52.078441°N 4.329637°E: a children's playground lies directly opposite and further back the Hoftoren can be seen.

==== Perspective Frame ====
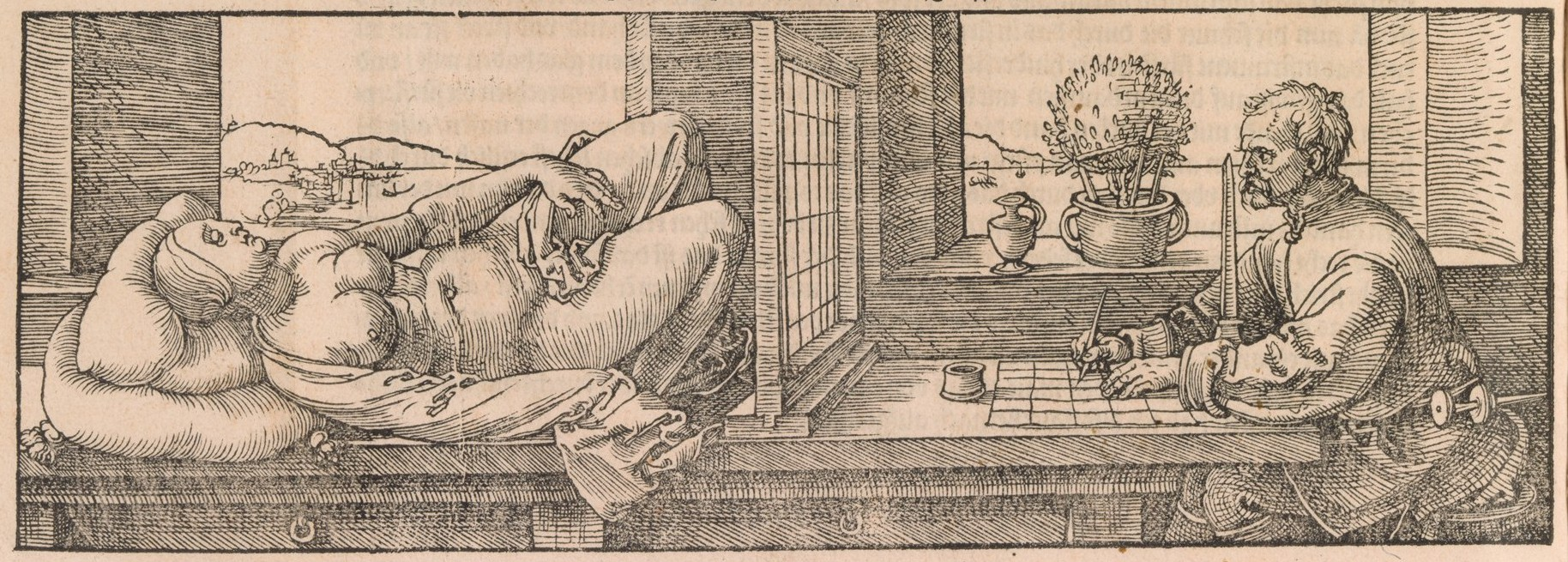
A 1525 woodcut by Albrecht Dürer demonstrating the use of a perspective frame (in Unterweisung der Messung mit dem Zirkel und Richtscheit. Das Lehrbuch der Malerei).

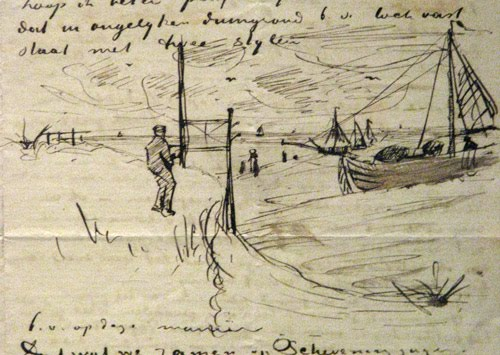
A sketch in Letter 253 showing how van Gogh proposed to use his new perspective frame in the dunes at Scheveningen.

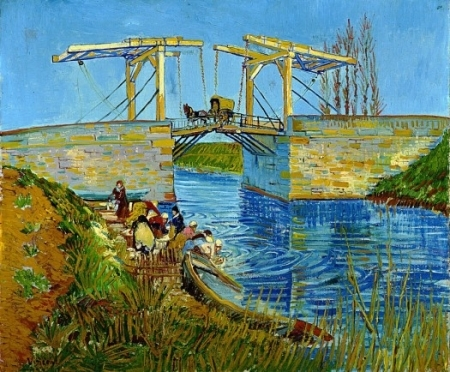
Bridge at Arles, oil on canvas, March 1888 (F397, JH1368).

Van Gogh used a perspective frame to help him with his drawing. This is a device that had been used for centuries by such artists as Leonardo da Vinci and Albrecht Dürer, and is still used today by artists and students in the form of simple cardboard cut-outs threaded with cotton. Many of his drawings show traces of squaring as a result of using this technique.

The versions used by van Gogh were elaborate affairs, however. The final version he had made for him at The Hague by a carpenter living next door had adjustable legs so that he could use it in rough terrain. He also used his perspective frame indoors to study his models, and one reason he moved to a larger studio next door was to make better use of his perspective frame.

Van Gogh called his perspective frame his "little window". Writing about Roofs Seen from the Artist's Attic Window (below), he wrote:

"So you must imagine me sitting at my attic window as early as 4 o’clock, studying the meadows and the carpenter's yard with my perspective frame — as the fires are lit in the court to make coffee, and the first worker ambles into the yard.

Over the red tiled roofs comes a flock of white pigeons flying between the black smoking chimneys. But behind this an infinity of delicate, gentle green, miles and miles of flat meadow, and a grey sky as still, as peaceful as Corot or Van Goyen.

That view over the ridges of the roofs and the gutters in which the grass grows, very early in the morning and the first signs of life and awakening — the bird on the wing, the chimney smoking, the figure far below ambling along — this is the subject of my watercolour. I hope you’ll like it.
Whether I succeed in the future depends, I believe, more on my work than on anything else. Provided I can stay on my feet, well I’ll fight my fight quietly in this way and no other, that is by calmly looking through my little window at the things in nature, and drawing them faithfully and lovingly."

Van Gogh took his perspective frame with him to Arles, using it notably in Bridge at Arles. He dispensed with at Auvers, however.

Naifeh and Smith suggest that windows played an important role in van Gogh's life, as a way of gazing at the world without distraction, unobserved.

==== Gallery ====
The very fine study Tree Roots in a Sandy Ground ('Les racines') was renamed Les Racines by the Kröller-Müller Museum, Otterlo, identifying it with a drawing mentioned in a letter to Theo of 1 May 1882. In that letter, van Gogh said he wanted to express something of life's struggle, as also in a larger version (now lost) of Sorrow, his iconic nude study of Sien completed at the same time. Sorrow is cited by Jan Hulsker as an example of the technical proficiency van Gogh had attained in the six months since his first clumsy attempts at figure drawing in Etten the year before, and the same degree of mastery is evident in Tree Roots. Tree roots were also the subject of one of the last paintings (if not actually the last) van Gogh made before his death, presumed a suicide, in 1890. This was Tree Roots, although there is no evidence that he was similarly preoccupied with the theme of life's struggle at the time of its painting. The 1882 drawing Tree Roots was purchased by the Dordrecht art collector J. Hidde Nijland before 1895. Nijland's entire collection of 116 van Gogh drawings that he built up was purchased in 1928 by the Dutch shipping magnate Anton Kröller, husband of Helene Kröller-Müller, for 100,000 guilders, and became the nucleus of the collection at the Kröller-Müller Museum.

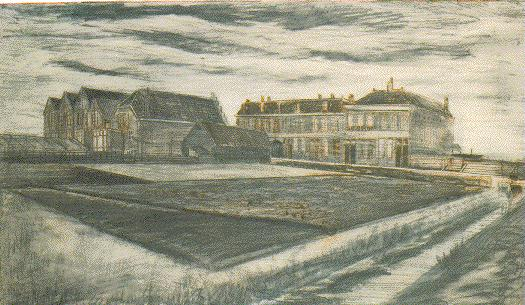
Houses on Schenkweg, pencil, heightened with chalk and sepia, March 1882, Stedelijk Museum, Amsterdam (F915, JH 122).

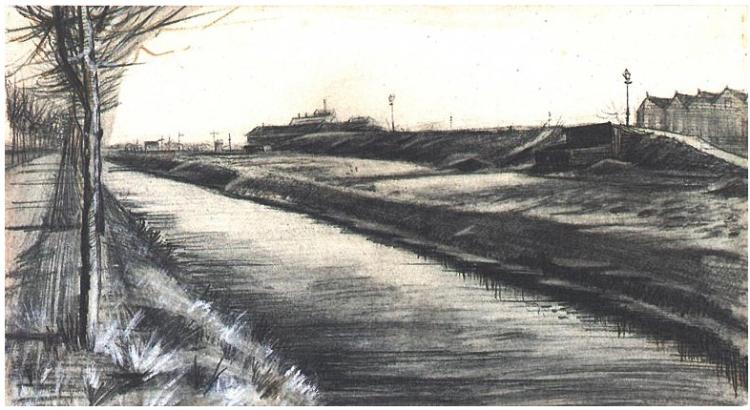
Ditch along the Schenkweg, pencil, pen and brush in black ink, grey wash, white opaque watercolour, traces of squaring, on laid paper, March 1882, Kröller-Müller Museum, Otterlo (F921, JH116).

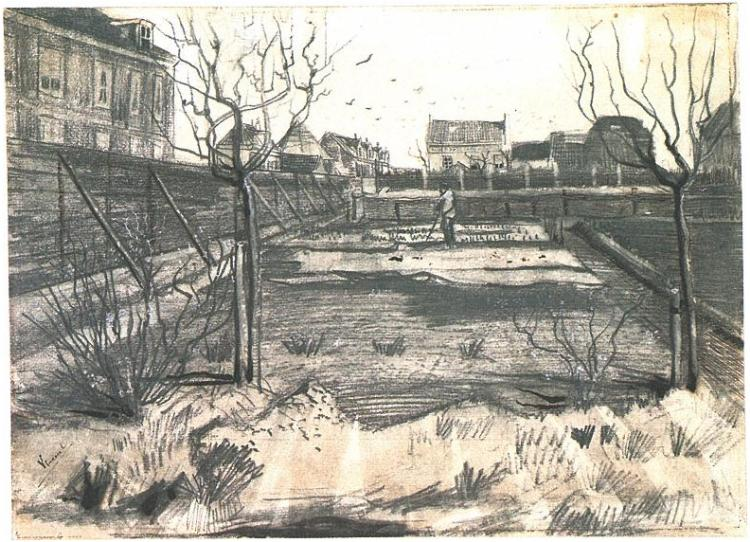
Florist's Garden on the Schenkweg, black chalk, pen, wash, China ink, slightly heightened with white, April 1882, Stedelijk Museum, Amsterdam (F923, JH125).

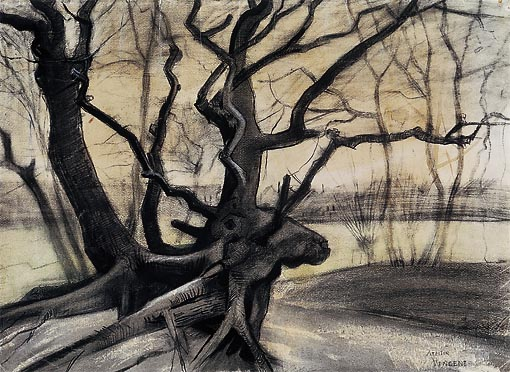
Tree roots in a sandy ground ('Les racines'), pencil, black chalk, brush in ink, brown and grey wash, opaque watercolour on watercolour paper, April–May 1882,Kröller-Müller Museum, Otterlo (F933, JH142). (Note: "Tree roots in a sandy ground ('Les racines')". Kröller-Müller Museum, Otterlo.)

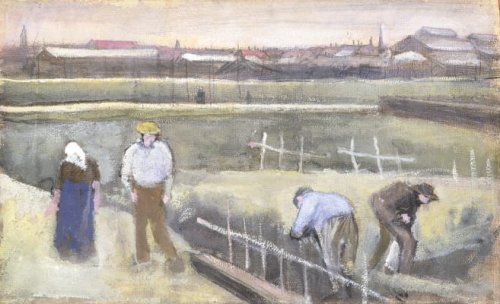
Diggers in Schenkweg, watercolor, July 1882, Private collection, The Hague (F927, JH161).

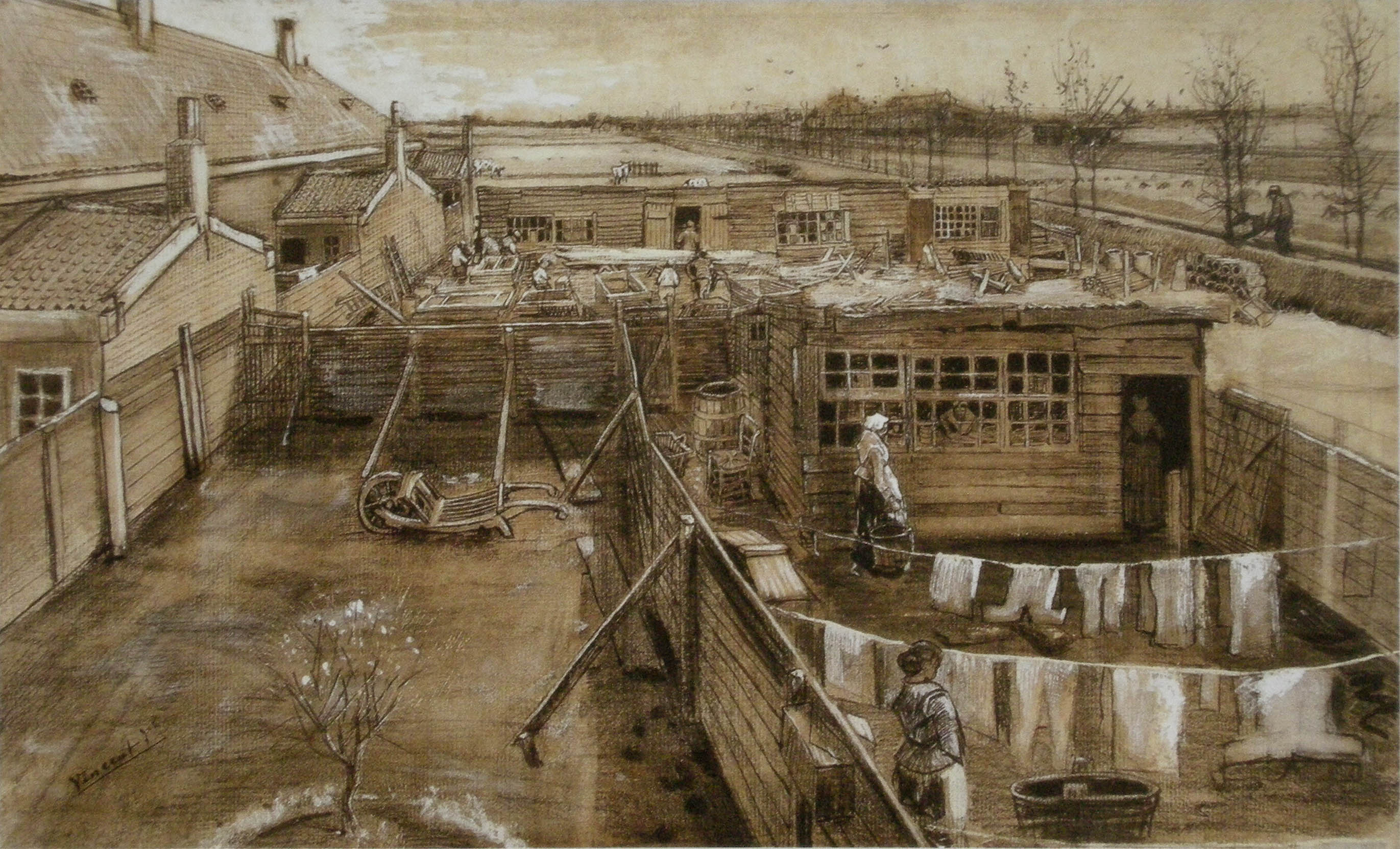
Carpenter's yard and laundry, pencil, black chalk, pen and brush in black ink, brown wash, opaque watercolour, scratched, traces of squaring, on laid paper, May 1882, Kröller-Müller Museum, Otterlo (F939, JH150).

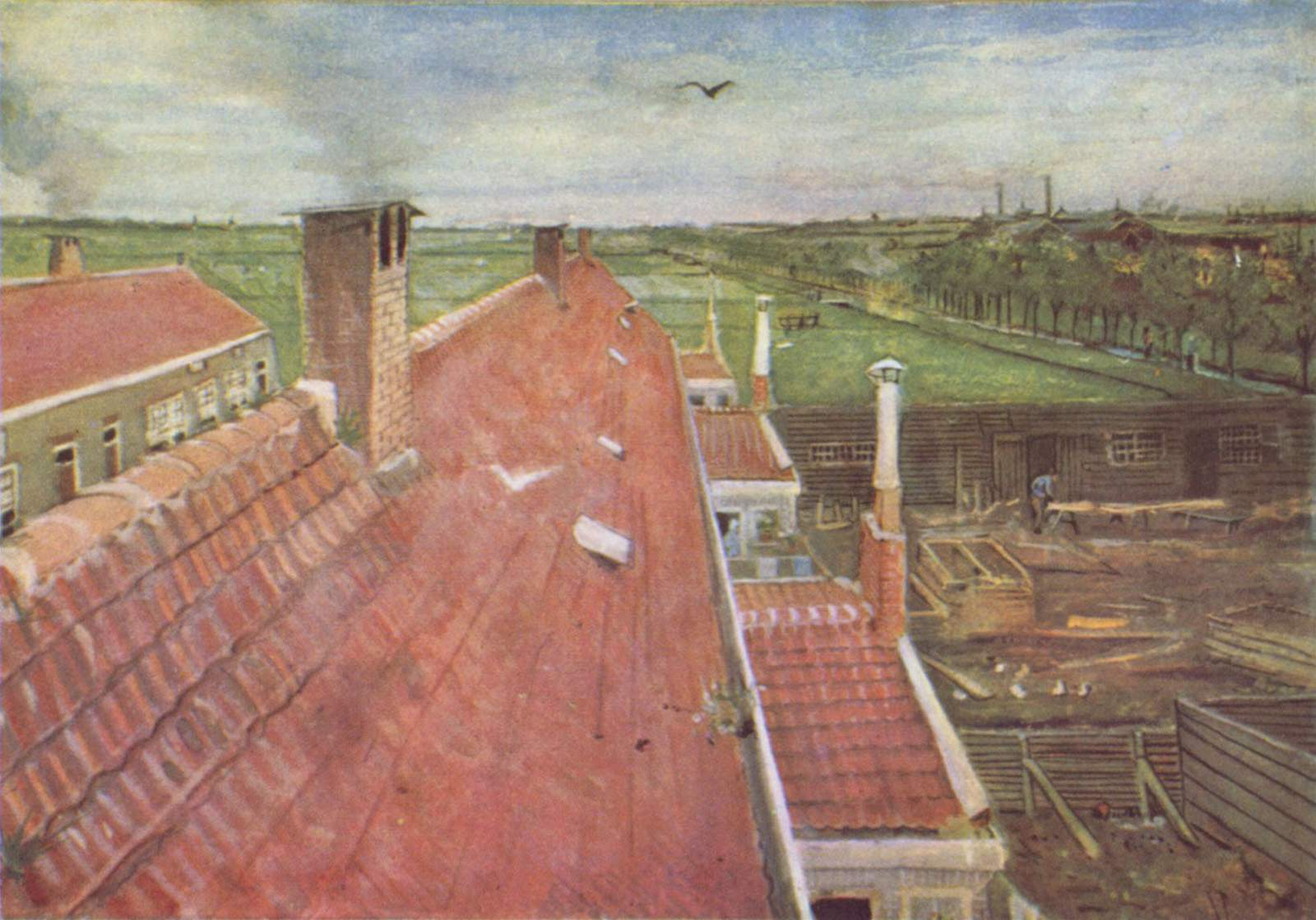
Roofs Seen from the Artist's Attic Window, watercolor heightened with white, July 1882, Private collection, Paris (F943, JH156).

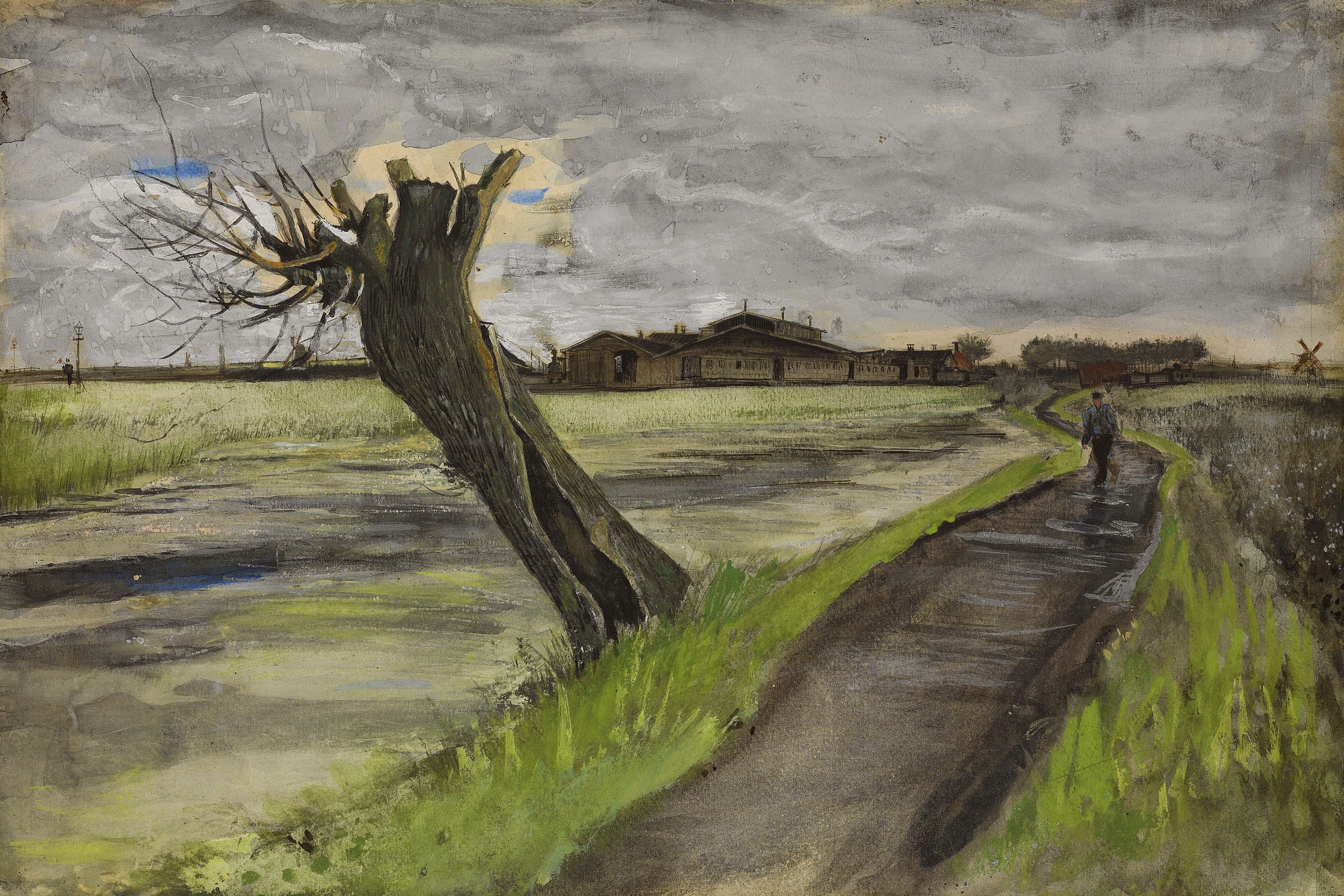
Pollard Willow, watercolour, gouache and pen and ink on paper, July 1882, Private collection (F947, JH164).

=== Rijnspoor and modernity ===
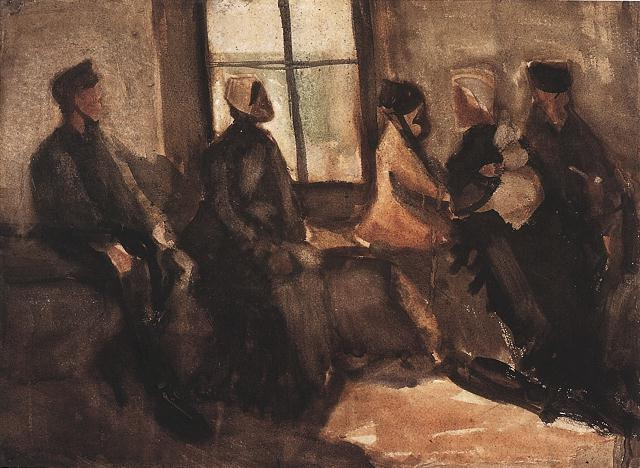
Third-class Waiting Room, watercolor, January 1882, Private collection, New York (F909, JH74). This is another of van Gogh's very earliest watercolors.

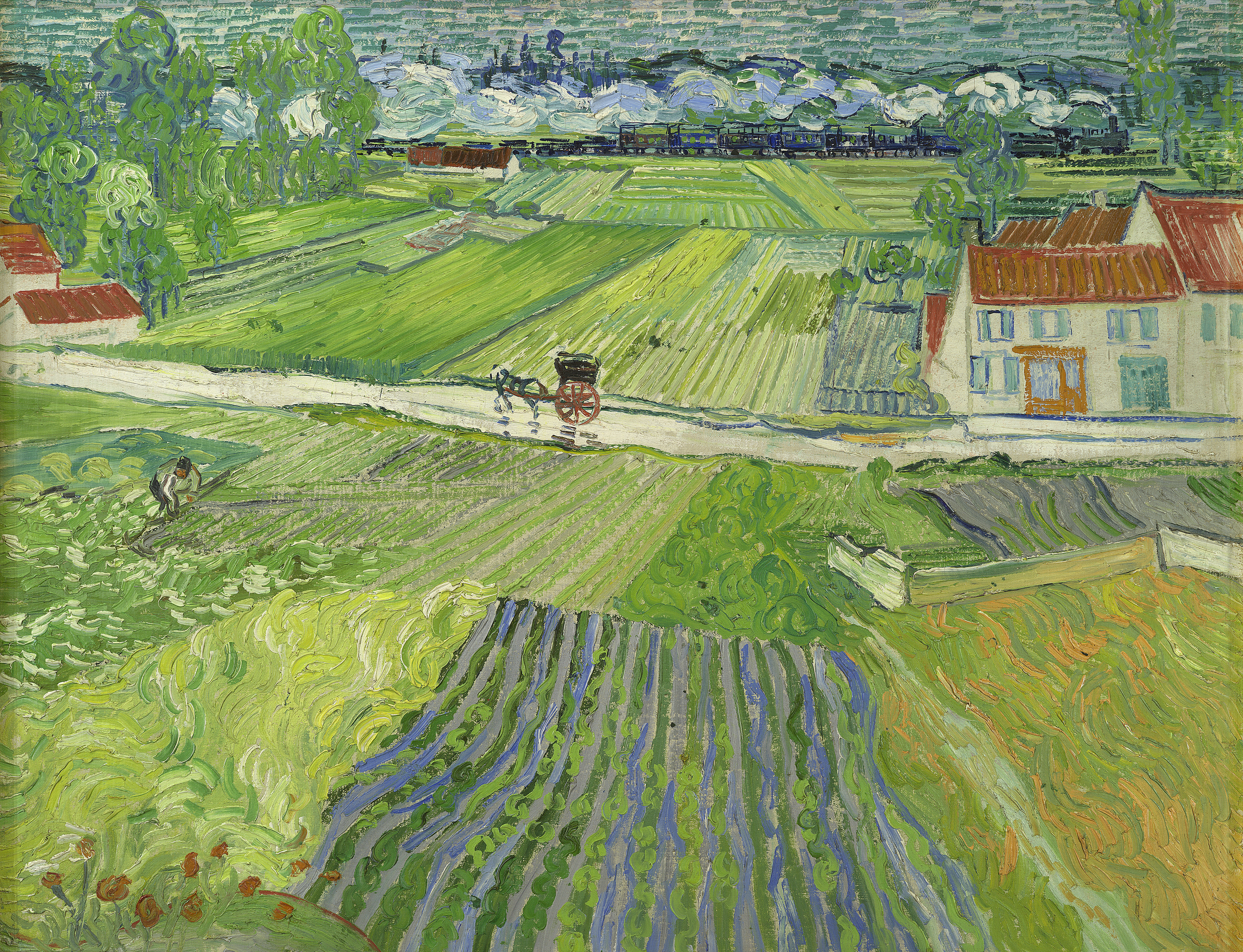
Landscape with a Carriage and a Train, oil on canvas, June 1890, Pushkin Museum, Moscow (F760, JH2019).

The Rijnspoor railway station was built in 1870. The railway line from Utrecht passed within a few hundred yards of van Gogh's front door and he must have been constantly aware of the trains passing to and fro. However, he seemed not to have sketched or painted them at this time, as he was to later in such works as Landscape with a Carriage and a Train (right).

Nevertheless, his artist's eye was not offended by modernity, and van Gogh regularly incorporated images of modernity into his drawings and paintings. He liked to sketch in the third-class waiting room at Rijnspoor as well as in the railway yards. In a letter to Theo written that October, he describes the scene at the yards:

"... it looks very different here, but it's beautiful too in its way, the Rijnspoor yards, for example. In the foreground the cinder road with the poplars that are starting to lose their leaves — then the ditch or canal full of duckweed, with a high bank with withered grass and bulrushes growing on it, then the grey or brown-grey earth of dug-over potato fields or patches planted with greenish purple red cabbage — here and there a really very fresh green of autumn weeds newly shot up, and above them beanpoles with wilting stalks and the reddish or green beanpods — beyond this strip of land the red rusted and black rails in yellow sand — here and there piles of old wood — mountains of coal, disused wagons — above them on the right several roofs and the goods depot — to the left a view of extensive, damp green meadows, cut off at the horizon far away by a grey band in which trees, red roofs and black factory chimneys can be made out. Over it a slightly yellow but still grey sky, very chilly and wintery, which hangs down low and from which a sort of drizzle comes in waves and in which many hungry crows fly. Yet a good deal of light falls on everything, which is especially evident when a few figures in blue or white smocks potter about in the yards, when their shoulders and heads catch the light. However, I imagine that it looks considerably brighter and less chilly in Paris. For the chillness gets into the house, and when you light a pipe there's something of the drizzle in it, as it were. But it's very beautiful."

He was equally lyrical describing Landscape with a Carriage and a Train in a letter to his sister Wil:

"Lately I’ve been working a lot and quickly; by doing so I’m trying to express the desperately swift passage of things in modern life.

Yesterday in the rain I painted a large landscape viewed from a height in which there are fields as far as the eye can see, different types of greenery, a dark green field of potatoes, between the regular plants the lush, violet earth, a field of peas in flower whitening to the side, a field of pink-flowered lucerne with a small figure of a reaper, a field of long, ripe grass, fawn in hue, then wheatfields, poplars, a last line of blue hills on the horizon, at the bottom of which a train is passing, leaving behind it an immense trail of white smoke in the greenery. A white road crosses the canvas. On the road a little carriage and white houses with stark red roofs beside this road. Fine rain streaks the whole with blue or grey lines."

==== Gallery ====
The drawings Rijnspoor Station, Factory and Gasworks may have been part of a series of twelve studies of the Hague commissioned by van Gogh's Uncle Cor, Cornelis Marinus van Gogh, who owned a book store in Amsterdam where he also sold prints. Cor visited van Gogh in his studio in early March 1882 and had looked through van Gogh's portfolio, mostly without comment. But when he alighted on van Gogh's drawing Old Street (below) in the Jewish quarter in the Paddemoes area, which van Gogh had made on a sketching trip with Breitner, he was sufficiently impressed by it to commission twelve drawings from van Gogh at a price of a rijkdaalder (two and a half guilders) each. Van Gogh declared it a miracle in a letter to Theo. Cor ordered a further six in April, but payment was slow in arriving for this second commission and when it finally came it was less than expected and apparently accompanied by a reprimand, real or imagined, reproaching him for imagining "such drawings had the least commercial value". There were no further orders.

The Iron Mill at the Hague was the Enthoven factory at The Hague situated on the Zieke, a street running parallel to the Schenkweg. The Pollard Willow (above) lay on the path towards it, the Rijnspoor yards visible on the horizon. The owner, Lodewijk Cornelis Enthoven, an industrialist and art collector, acquired a considerable collection of van Gogh's work from the Hague, including a second version (F944) of Carpenter's Yard and Laundry (above), and later from van Gogh's Nuenen and Paris periods. His art collection was sold in 1920 at his death. Some twenty of his van Gogh works were purchased by Helene Kröller-Müller, and eventually passed into the collection of the Kröller-Müller Museum. Family tradition had it that Enthoven supported van Gogh financially at The Hague and later received an 'endless stream of laments, ... all of them accompanied by small sketches and scratches' from Nuenen and Antwerp. Later still, it is said van Gogh sent him rolls of painting and sketches from France. Supposedly, these were found unopened in Enthoven's attic by his children and burned. However, there is no evidence to support this tradition and Lodewijk Enthoven is not mentioned directly in van Gogh's surviving letters.

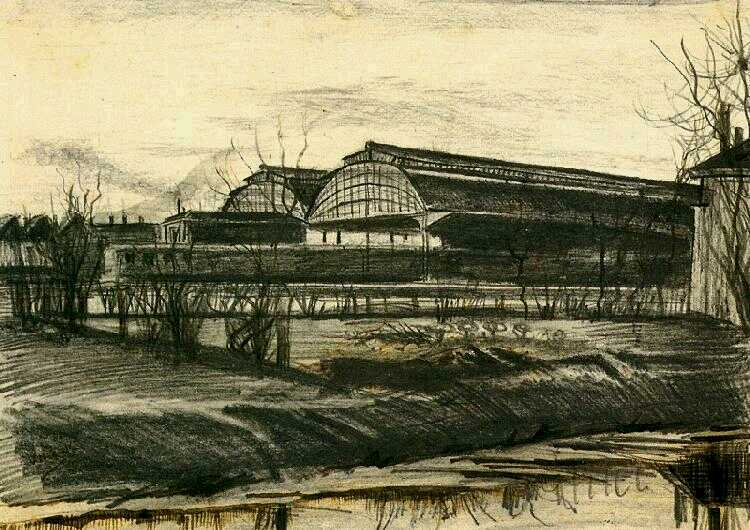
The Railway Station Rijnspoor, pencil and pen, March 1882, Private collection, The Hague (F919, JH123).

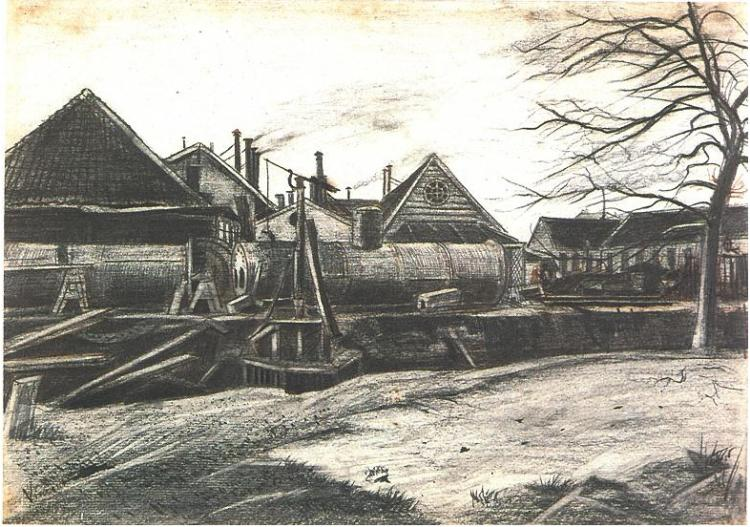
Factory, pencil and pen, March 1882, Staatliche Kunsthalle Karlsruhe, Karlsruhe (F925, JH117).

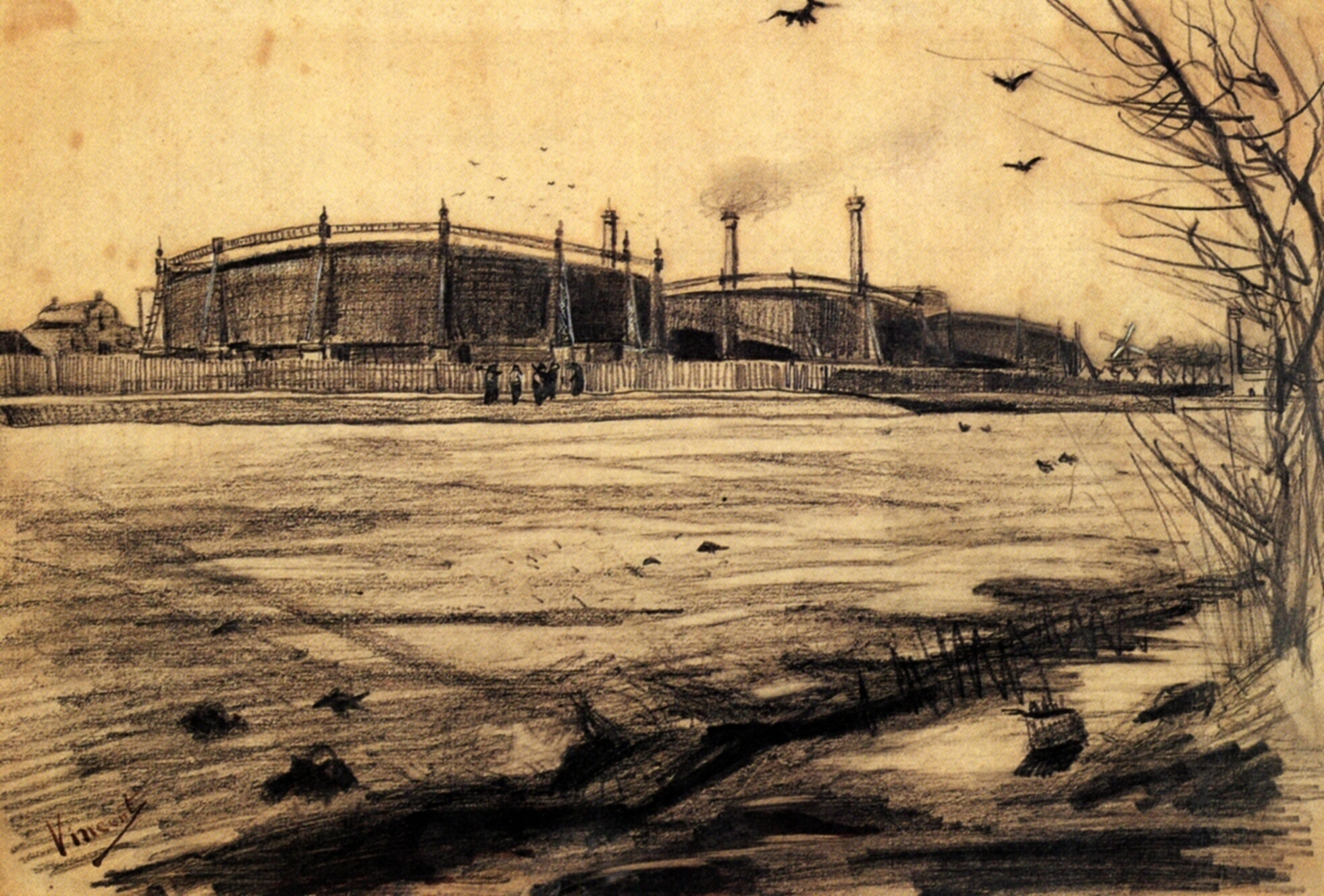
Gasworks, pencil, pen and ink, brush and transparent watercolor on paper, March 1882, Van Gogh Museum, Amsterdam (F924, JH118).

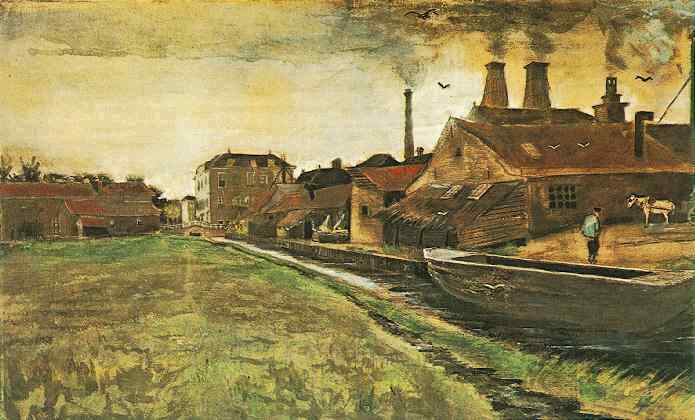
The Iron Mill in The Hague, watercolor, July 1882, Private collection (F926, JH166).

== Other locations ==
=== On the street ===
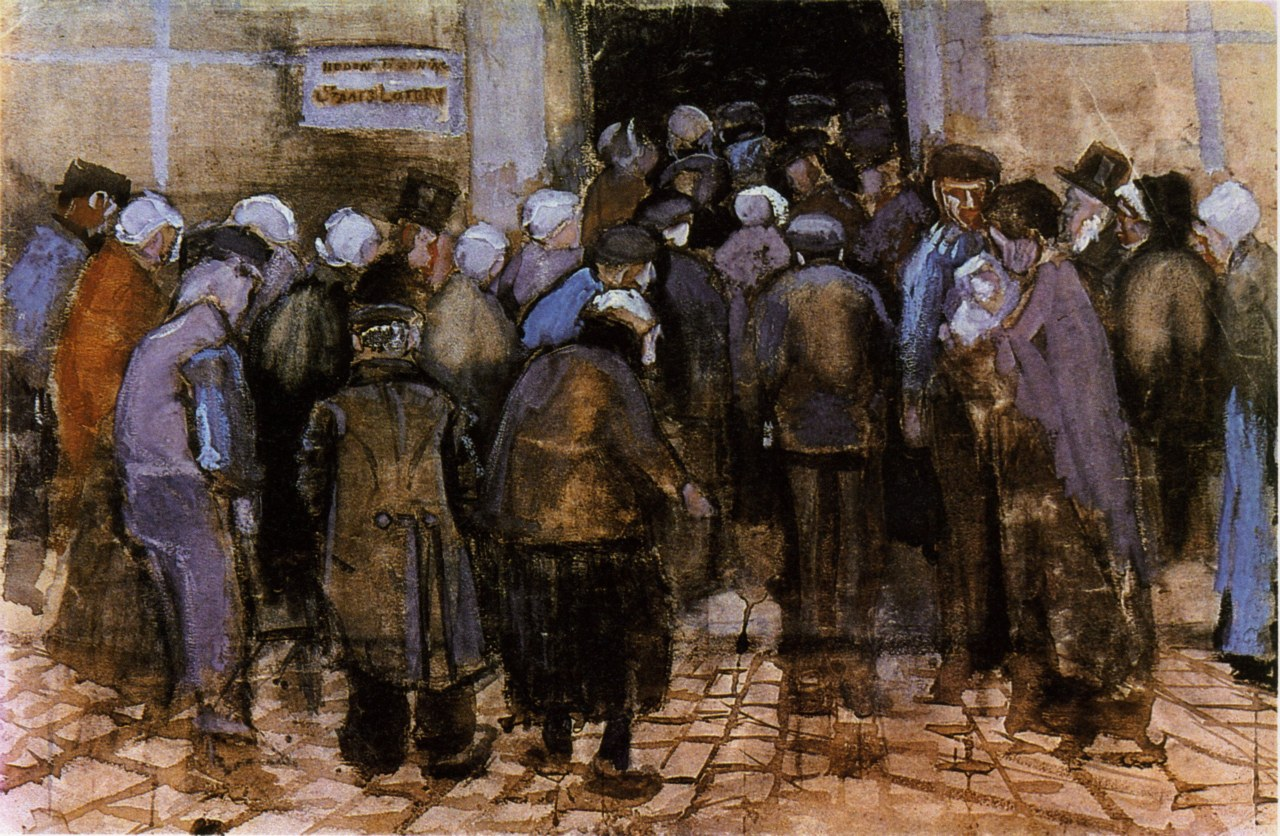
The State Lottery Office ('The Poor and Money'), watercolor, September 1882, Van Gogh Museum, Amsterdam (F970, JH222).

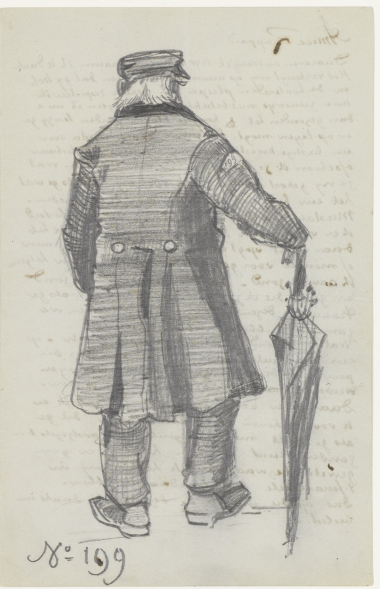
Orphan Man with Long Overcoat and Umbrella, Seen from the Back, sketch in letter 268 (R14), October 1882, Private Collection, United States (JH214). The model is Adrianus Jacobus Zuyderland.

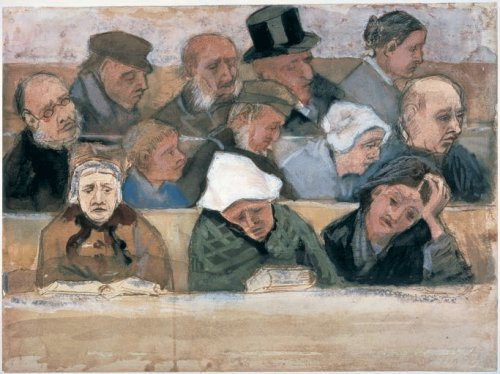
Church Pew with Worshippers, pencil, pen and ink, opaque and transparent watercolour, on wove paper, September 1882, Kröller-Müller Museum, Otterlo (F967, JH225).

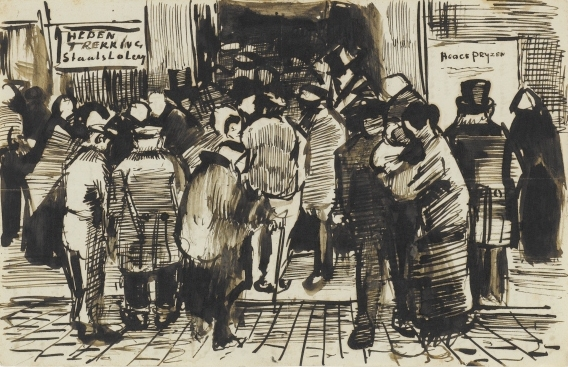
Today's Draw, sketch in letter 270, Van Gogh Museum, Amsterdam,(F-, JH223).

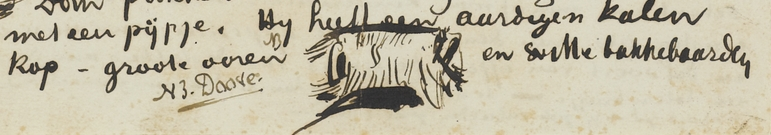
"... a splendid bald head, big ears and white sidewhiskers (n.b. deaf)."

Van Gogh made many drawings he called "scratches", taken directly from life on the spot outdoors. Although these have a fresh spontaneous character, they were nevertheless carefully reworked in his studio with the aid of his models and perspective frame.

He sought his subjects in the working-class district of the Geest and its adjoining markets. The Geest was a tightly packed district of narrow streets and courtyards on the west side of The Hague. At the Papestraat, on its eastern flank, it lay scarcely two hundred yards from Goupil's prestigious address at Plaats 20 in the center of the city. It was the district his mistress Sien Hoornik had come from. But the kind of courtyards, called hofjes, that Sien's mother lived in were nothing like the elegant little hofjes seen in Dutch cities today. They were little more than slums created by building warrens of tiny houses between and behind existing town houses to accommodate a rapidly expanding population, and they have long since disappeared. Van Gogh described the area as the 'Whitechapel' of The Hague in a letter to his friend and mentor Anthon van Rappard. Breitner had his studio on its northern flank at no. 16 Juffrouw Idastraat at 52.078849°N 4.305106°E: the house still stands.

The State Lottery office was situated in the Spuistraat a little to the south of the Geest district, the oldest and busiest shopping street in The Hague. This was where van Gogh's uncle Cent had originally opened his art store that eventually merged with Goupil. In October 1882, Van Gogh made a watercolor of a group of people queuing in front of the lottery (right) as part of his plan to produce a 'saleable' work before the end of the year. To this end he had elected to make studies of groups of people 'doing something or other', studies that had something 'nice and sociable about them'. He wrote of this painting:

"You may remember Mooijman's state lottery office at the beginning of Spuistraat. I passed it one rainy morning when a throng of people were standing there waiting to get lottery tickets. For the most part they were old women and the sort of people of whom it's impossible to say what they do or how they live, but who evidently potter along and fret and get on with life. Of course, viewed superficially, a crowd of folk who evidently attach so much importance to "Today's draw" is something that almost makes you and me laugh, because we’re not in the least bit interested in the lottery.

But the group of people — and their waiting expression — struck me, and it took on a larger, deeper meaning for me while I was working on it than in the first moment. It becomes more meaningful, I believe, if one thinks of it as "The Poor and Money". That, in fact, applies to nearly all figure groups: one occasionally has to think about them for a while before one understands what one is seeing. The curiosity and delusion about the lottery seem more or less childish to us, but it becomes serious when one thinks about the other side: misery and forlorn attempts by these poor souls to be saved, so they think, by buying a lottery ticket, paid for with pennies saved by going without food."

In the same letter he also mentioned that he was working on a painting of a church pew that he had seen in a small church in the Geest where the almsmen went. This was probably the Bethlehemskerk, since demolished, in the Breedstraat, the 'church of the poor' behind Slijkeinde in the Geest where Sien's mother had her house. Attendance at the church was compulsory. The painting was Church Pew with Worshippers (above right), and several of his models of the time can be recognised in it. Hulsker remarks that the huddling of figures in State Lottery was certainly more successful than that in Church Pew, a subject apparently beyond him. Van Gogh went on to say that almsmen in that district were known as 'orphan men', and said he had taken on a bald, deaf, old orphan man with white sideboards as a model, providing a little scratch (left) of his bald head in his letter. This was Zuyderland (above left), who went on to feature in dozens of subsequent studies over the following winter months. He is the figure in a top hat to the right in the letter sketch for State Lottery (above left), and appears in profile, recognisable by his trademark whiskers, in the watercolor itself.

Naifeh and Smith characterise the Geest as the red-light district of The Hague, and suggest that van Gogh was already using prostitutes during his time at Goupil's. Certainly by 1882 he was frank about using prostitutes, even recommending them to Theo in his letters. Sien Hoornik herself was a prostitute. Both van Gogh and Breitner were hospitalised in 1882 for gonorrhea.

==== Van Gogh and Breitner ====
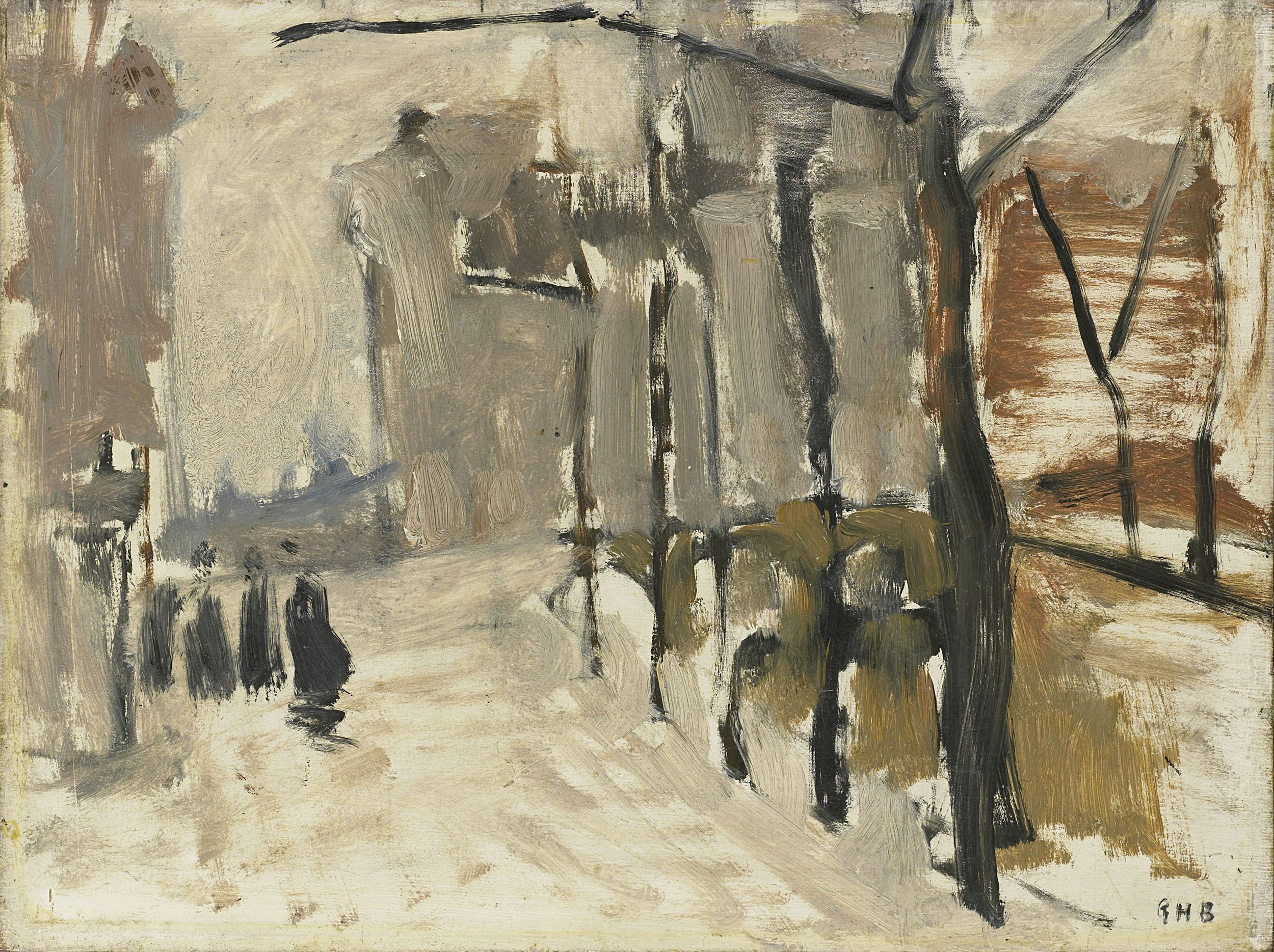
George Hendrik Breitner – Street View in The Hague (?), Rijksmuseum, Amsterdam (SK-A-3547). (Note: Breitner, George Hendrik. "Stadsgezicht in Den Haag (?)". Rijksmuseum.)

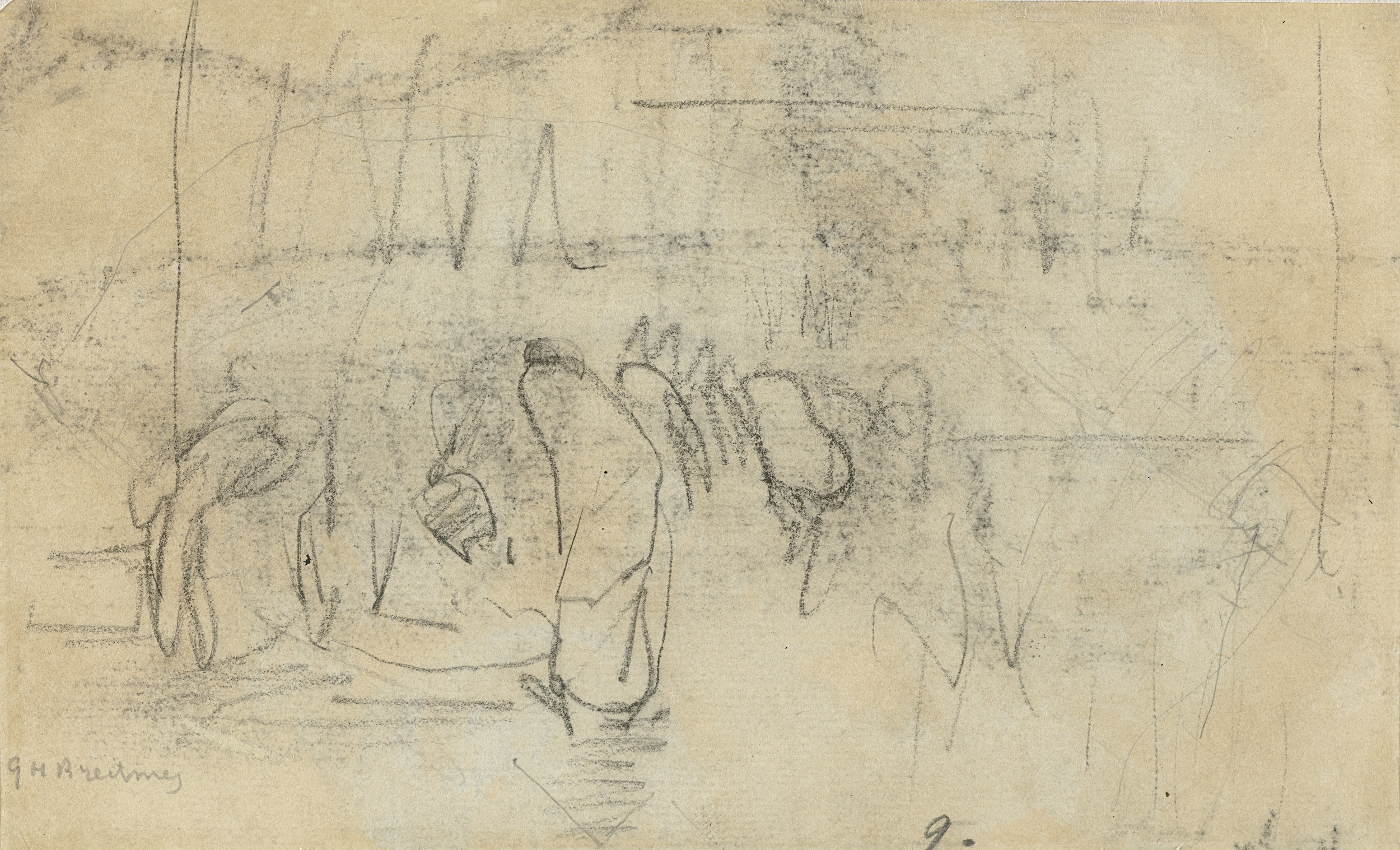
George Hendrik Breitner – Sketch of people on the street, Rijksmuseum, Amsterdam. (Note: Breitner, George Hendrik. "Sketch of people on the street". Rijksmuseum.)

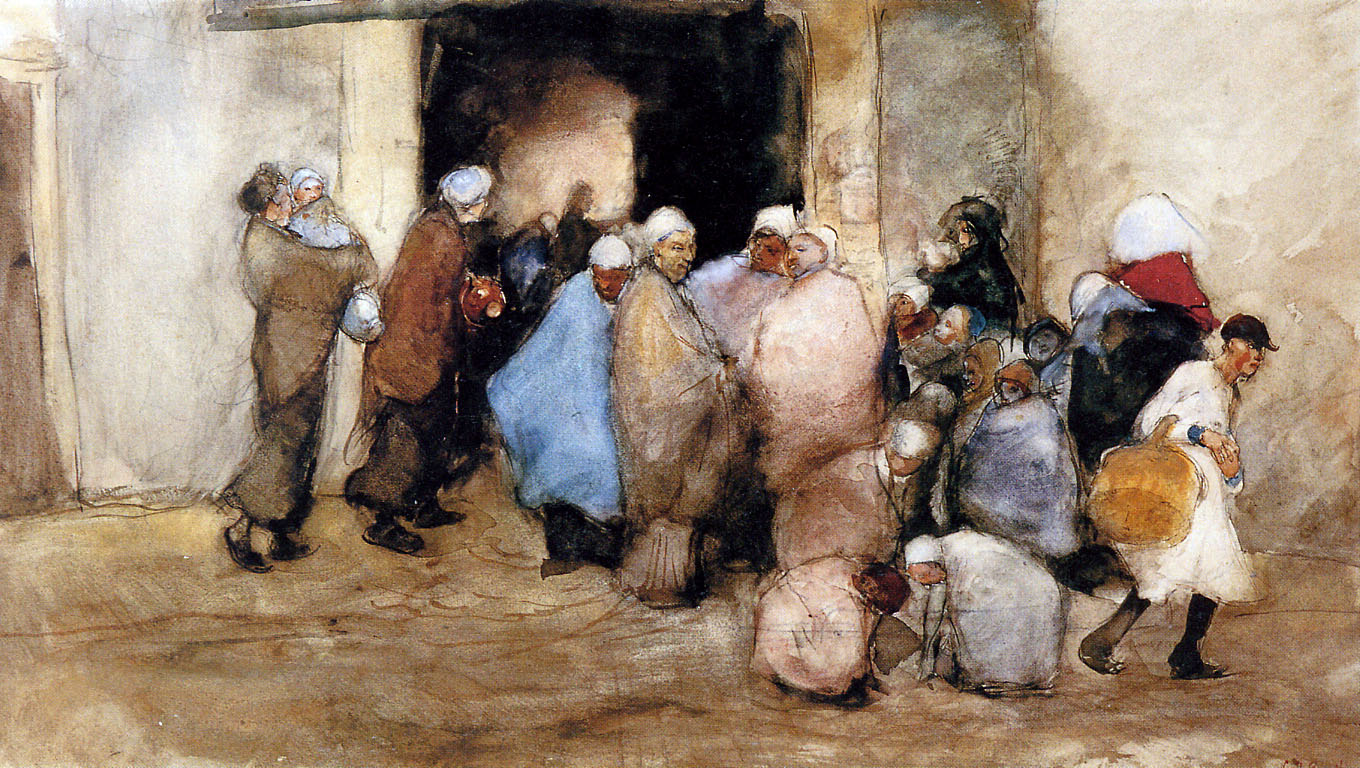
George Hendrik Breitner – Distribution of Soup, watercolor, 1882, Stedelijk Museum, Amsterdam.

George Hendrik Breitner came to enjoy considerable success as a painter and photographer. In his student days he associated with painters of the Hague School such as Jozef Israëls, Jacob Maris and Anton Mauve, and he was a member of the Pulchri Society. Later he distanced himself from the movement and he is now generally regarded as an Amsterdam Impressionist, although he retained the muted color palette of the Hague School.

Van Gogh appears to have been introduced to him by Theo, and the pair sketched together in the working-class districts of The Hague in the early months of 1882. Breitner was motivated to do so because he regarded himself as a painter of the common folk. Van Gogh, initially at any rate, was more intent on recruiting models. It is likely that Breitner introduced van Gogh to the novels of Émile Zola and the cause of social realism.

Breitner was hospitalised in April. Van Gogh visited him in hospital, but Breitner did not return the visits when van Gogh himself was hospitalised two months later, and they did not meet again until the following July when van Gogh was on the verge of leaving The Hague and Breitner spending more time in Rotterdam than the Hague. At that time van Gogh gave Theo a less than flattering account of Breitner's paintings as resembling mouldy wallpaper, although he did say he thought he would be all right in the end. For his part, there is no evidence that Breitner saw anything notable in van Gogh's work. He later reminisced that sketching with van Gogh was problematic because, whereas Breitner sketched discreetly in a notebook, van Gogh came laden with apparatus and attracted hostile attention. In a letter to Theo of 11 September 1882, van Gogh recounted how a fellow suddenly spat a wad of tobacco onto his drawing while sketching at the potato market.

Two years after van Gogh's death, Breitner wrote that he did not like van Gogh's paintings:"‘I can’t help it, but to me it seems like art for Eskimos, I cannot enjoy it. I honestly find it coarse and distasteful, without any distinction, and what's more, he has stolen it all from Millet and others."

==== Sorrow ====
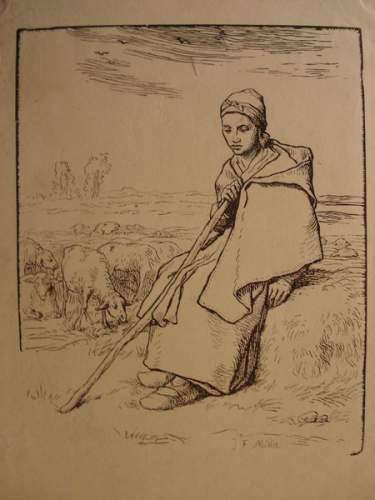
Jean-Baptise Millet (after Jean-François Millet) – La grande bergère assise, woodcut, c. 1874, various collections.

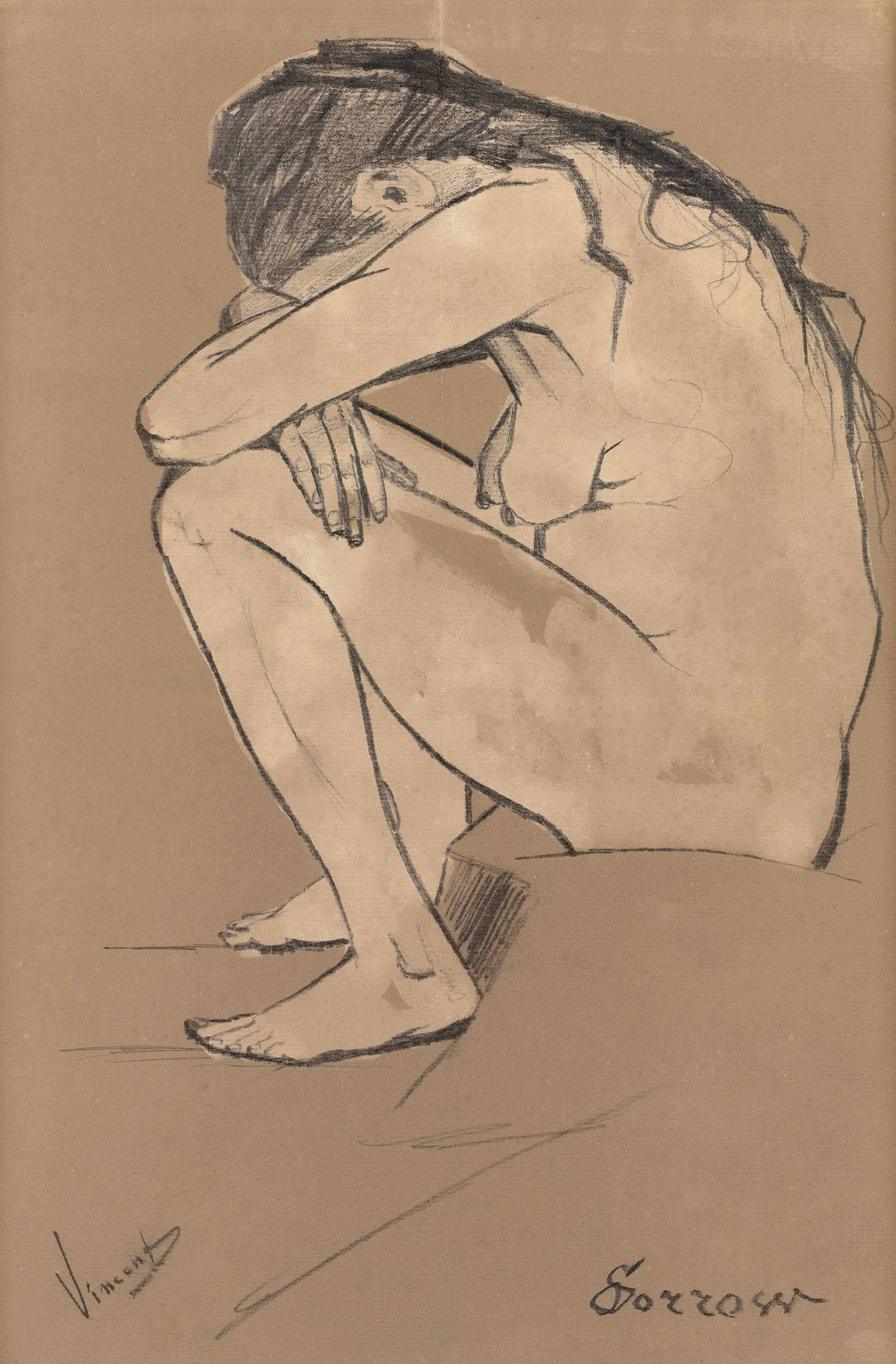
Sorrow, pencil and wash, signed lower left, April 1882, Private collection, The Hague (F929, JH129).

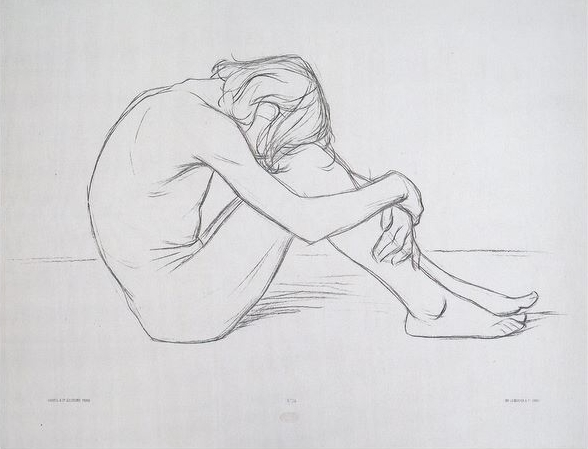
Charles Bargue – Man seated upon the ground, his head on his knees, plate III-24 of the Cours de Dessin

Van Gogh drew his famous nude study of Sien, Sorrow, in April 1882. There were originally three versions, two being imprints, of which two survive. F929 (right) is the signed pencil version he gave to van Rappard. The other surviving version, F929a, worked up in chalk and decorated with flowers and a quotation from Michelet, "How is it possible that a woman can be left alone on earth – abandoned?", comes from the estate of Jo Bonger, Theo's wife, but is not thought to be the one he sent to Theo, which was a pencil version and is now lost (that is to say, van Gogh kept the surviving chalk version with the Michelet quotation for himself). Regarding Sien's situation, it is noteworthy that in those days for a woman to be abandoned by her husband was considered grounds for withholding charity, as she was supposed to have necessarily brought her downfall on herself.

Van Gogh no doubt wanted to portray downfall in his original version of the drawing, but in a letter describing a later larger version he made soon after (also lost) he makes it clear that his program, in that version at any rate, was to depict something of life's struggle, a rare commentary on his intentions. Naifeh and Smith point out that van Gogh's final break with Mauve occurred less than a week later following that letter, implying that he was preparing the ground in his letter for the inevitable exposure of his affair with Sien.

According to van Gogh himself, the inspiration for the strong contour line was a woodcut after Millet, La grande bergère assise (left). Later, at Arles, he made a painting, The Shepherdess, F699, of the same subject. However, Hulsker thought the strongest influence was Bargue's Exercices au Fusain (Exercises in Charcoal Drawing), part of his celebrated Cours de Dessin (Drawing Course) published by Goupil (left), which Tersteeg had lent van Gogh in September 1880 and which van Gogh had said in a letter immediately preceding he had completed 'several times'. The course itself was not returned to Tersteeg until June 1883 at a meeting where Tersteeg again repeated his advice that van Gogh should concentrate on making watercolors rather than drawings.

Van Rappard was given the drawing in return for a gift of 2.50 guilders he had given van Gogh to get a tear in one of his drawings repaired:

"Rappard's visit cheered me up; he seems to be working hard.

He gave me 2.50 guilders because he saw a tear in a drawing and said, you should have that repaired. I know, I said, but I haven’t got the money and the drawing must be sent off. Then he said straightaway that he’d be glad to give it to me, and I could have had more but I didn’t want to, and I gave him a pile of woodcuts and a drawing in return. It was one of those meant for C.M. [Uncle Cor], and so I was very glad to be able to get it repaired, because it was the best of them all.

That same drawing may be sold later for 50 guilders or so, and now — I hadn’t got the money to have a tear in it repaired.

Anyway."

On 7 February 2005, the drawing was sold at Christie's in London for £680,000. On 20 June 2012, the drawing fetched £1,329,250 at the same auction house.

==== Social realism ====
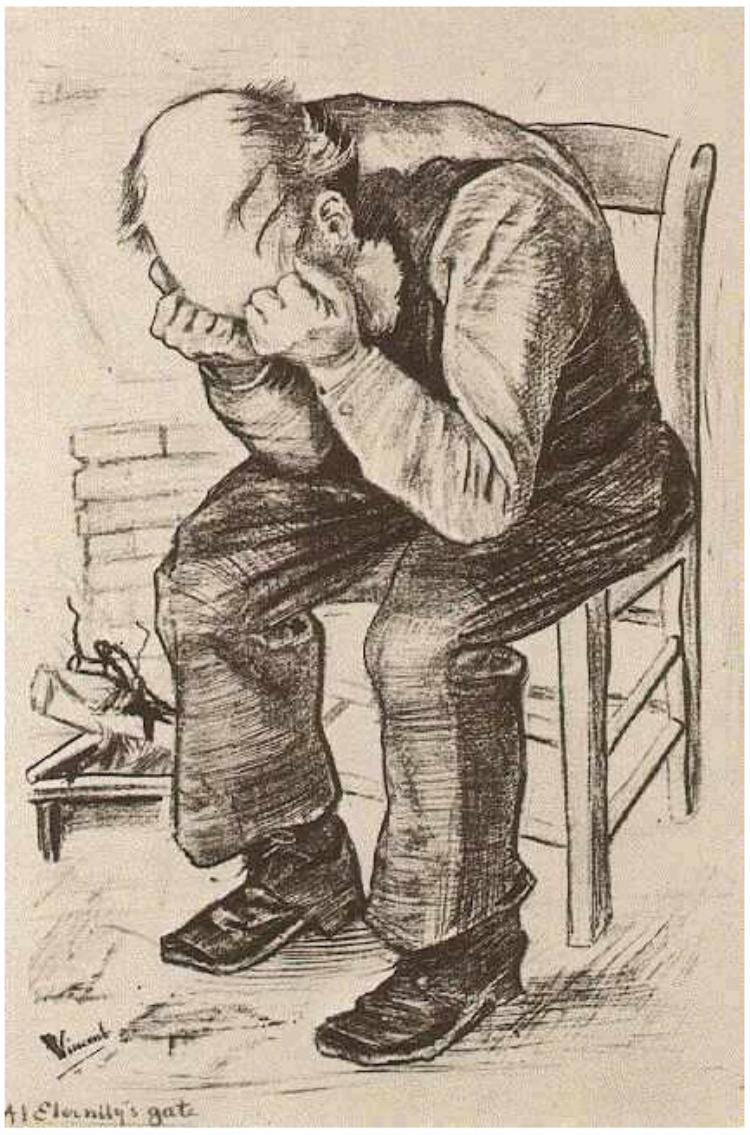
Old Man with his Head in his Hands ("At Eternity's Gate"), lithograph, 1882 (F1662, JH268), various collections, including Tehran Museum of Contemporary Art, whose version illustrated is annotated by the artist in ink at lower left: At Eternity's Gate. The model was Zuyderland.

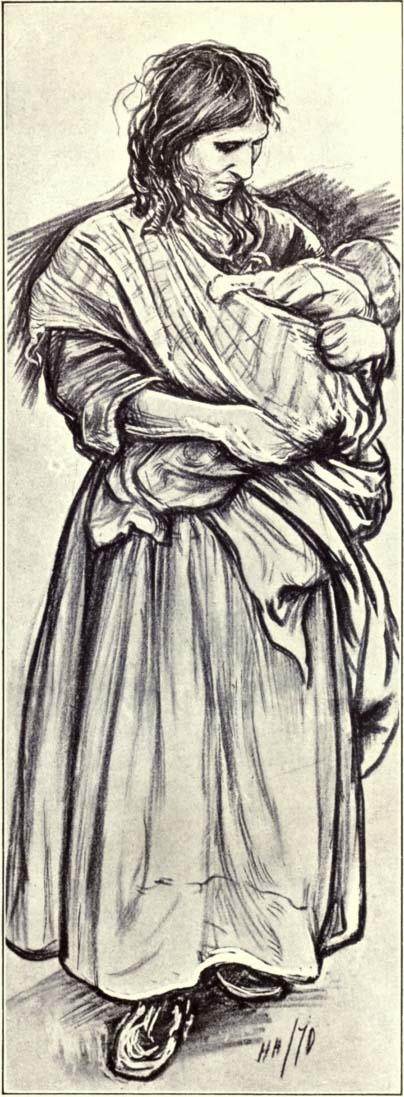
Hubert von Herkomer – Gipsy Woman with Child, 1870 (Herkomer's first work for The Graphic).

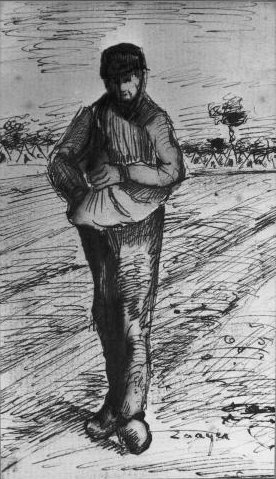
Sower: Etten (1881).

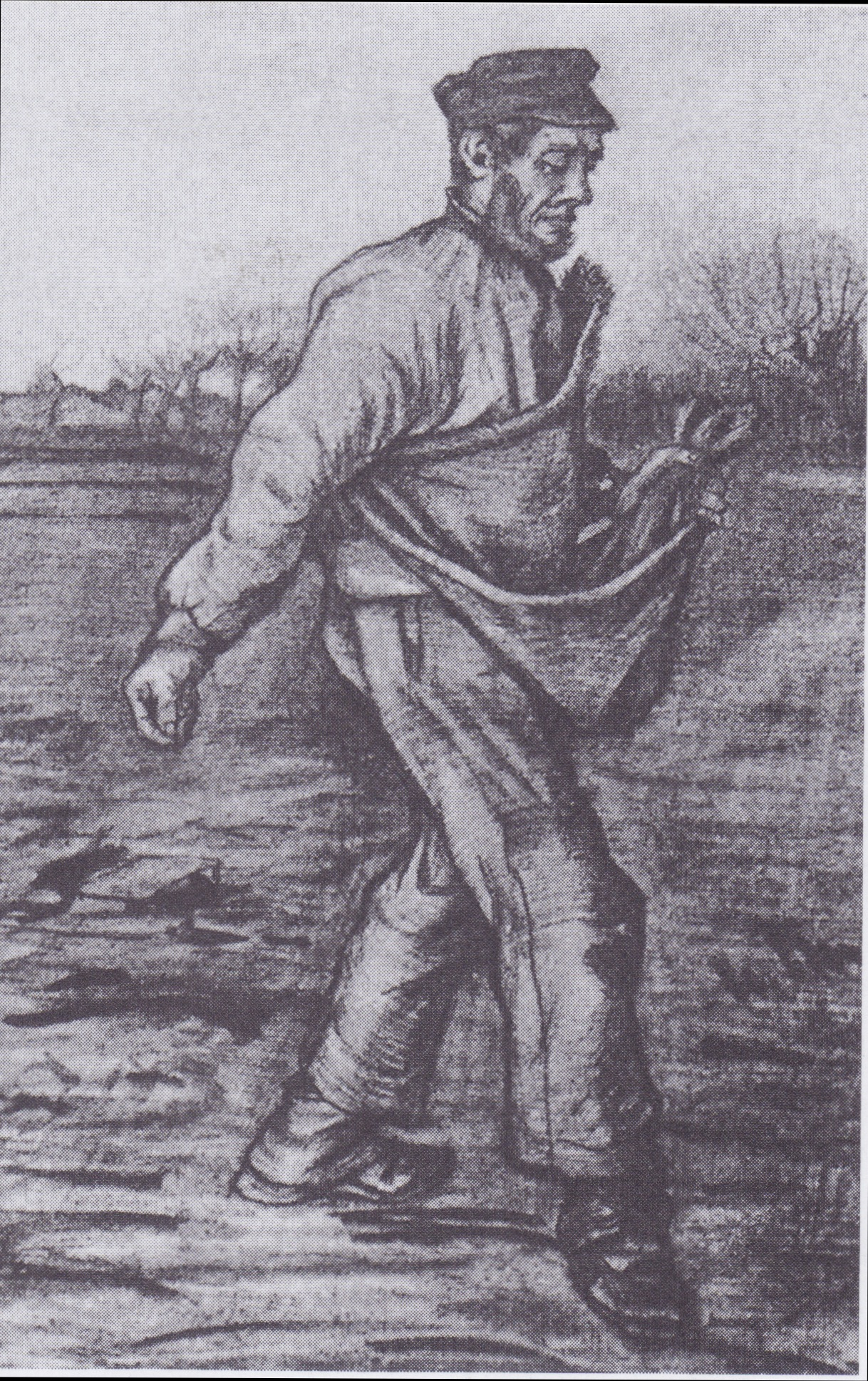
Sower: The Hague (1882).

Van Gogh was influenced especially by the social realism of the English illustrators, such as Hubert von Herkomer, Samuel Luke Fildes, and Frank Holl, working for The Graphic, a British weekly illustrated newspaper founded by the social reformer William Luson Thomas. Van Gogh frequently referred to them in his letters, and he had obtained a complete set of back numbers of The Graphic between 1870 and 1880, decorating his studio with his favourite prints.

By August 1882, he had taken up painting in oils in earnest but, despite a promising start, he abruptly abandoned it after a month, not to resume again until the following summer. Part of the reason was undoubtedly the expense of painting in oils, but Naifeh and Smith suggest the real reason was that at that time his heart lay in drawing: in his moving letter of 16 May 1882, describing his final humiliation from the family of Kee Vos and how he had come to meet Sien and his relationship with her, he wrote:

"I want to go through the domestic joys and sorrows myself so that I can draw them from experience. After I had left Amsterdam I felt that my love, which was truly honest, truly unfeigned and strong, had been literally beaten to death — yet after death one rises from the dead. Resurgam. Then I found Christien ..."

By September, Sien had recovered from her difficult confinement and was ready to pose again. At the same time, van Gogh had discovered his orphan man, Zuyderland, who became his favourite and most patient model. With the winter drawing in and working outdoors increasingly difficult, van Gogh retreated to his studio and returned to drawing figures. He used the remaining canvas from his work in oils to shutter his windows and adjust the light falling on his models.

In early November, Theo told him about a new development in lithography, a new kind of transfer paper which did away with the need to draw directly onto stone. Van Gogh was enthusiastic about the process and for a while entertained plans to prepare a series of prints.

==== Gallery ====
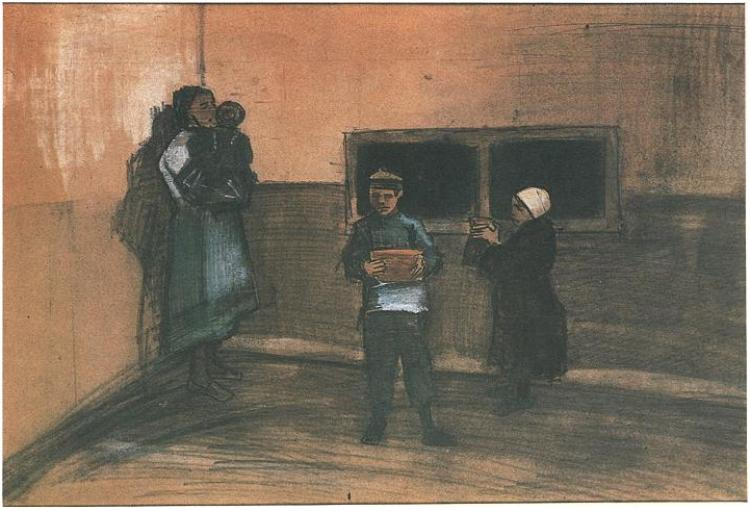
The Public Soup Kitchen, pencil, black mountain chalk, watercolor, March 1882, Private Collection, The Netherlands (F1020b, JH331).

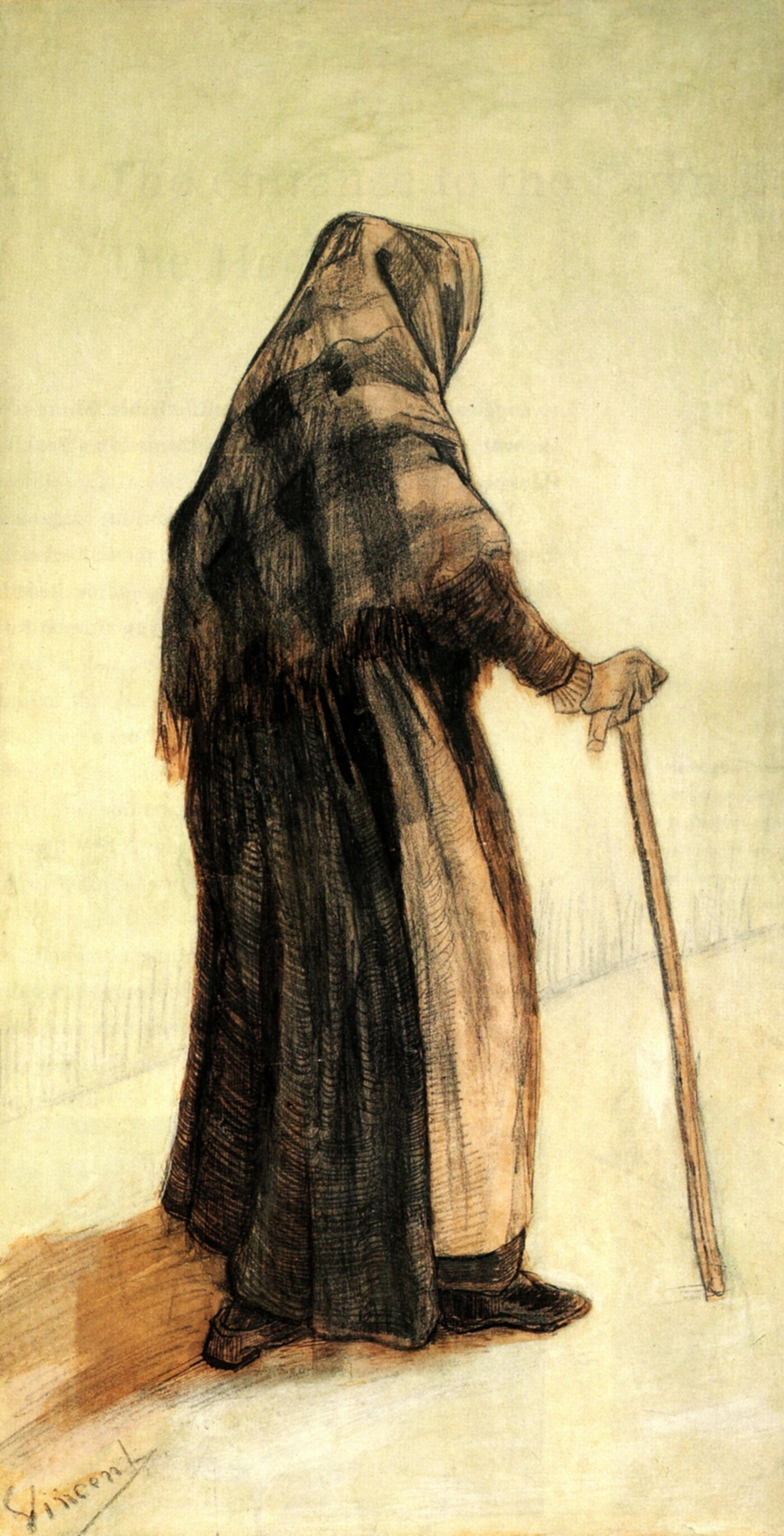
Old Woman Seen from Behind, pencil, pen, brown ink (originally black), opaque light green watercolor, March 1882, Van Gogh Museum, Amsterdam (F913, JH109).

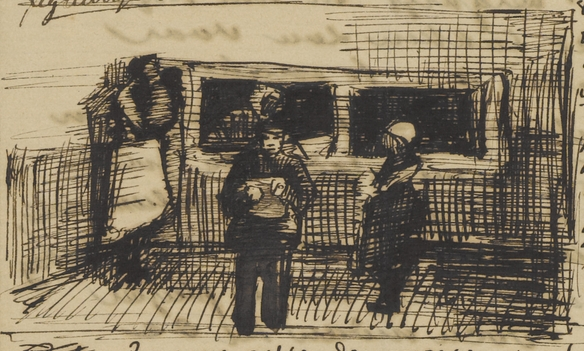
Sketch in letter 324 (F-, JH332).

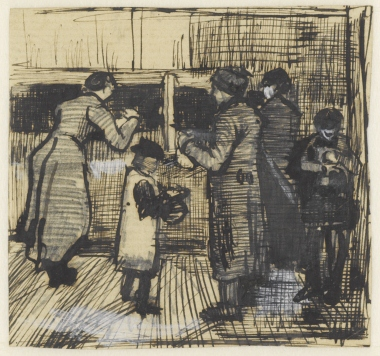
Sketch in letter 323 (F1020, JH333).

The Paddemoes (F918 below) lay in the Jewish quarter of the Buurt (the Court) near the Nieuwe Kerk (New Church). It was The Hague's poorest district in medieval times, but was demolished in 1649 when the Nieuwe Kerk was built. The Jewish community subsequently settled in the area from 1675 onwards. Van Gogh said he had made the drawing on a midnight jaunt with Breitner, seen from the Turfmarkt (the area has been extensively redeveloped since). This was the drawing that impressed his Uncle Cor sufficiently to commission a series of 12 similar studies from van Gogh.

The bakery in the Noordstraat (F914 below) lay in the Geest district, opposite Sien's mother's house at no. 16 and next to the newly built Zuid-Hollandsche Bierbrouwerij (South Holland Brewery). This brewery's brand of beer "ZHB", evidently not appreciated by all, was famously nicknamed Zieken Huis Bier (i.e. hospital beer). The area was extensively redeveloped in the 1930s and 1970s. A plaque for the brewery can be seen at 52.077157°N 4.299049°E.

The figure of the old woman in F914 appears as a sketch in a letter to Theo of 3 March 1882, as a very fine signed drawing Old Woman Seen from Behind (right), as well as reappearing in Diggers in Torn-Up Street (below). The drawing of the bakery has been identified as one of the series of twelve that Uncle Cor commissioned. Naifeh and Smith believe it had been made, along with a number of others in the series, before receiving the commission and not actually in response to the commission.

The torn-up street (F930a below) was at 15-17 Noordstraat, next to the bakery. There is a sketch of some figures enclosed with a letter to Theo of 23 April 1882 that are incorporated in the drawing and for this reason the drawing is dated as April 1882 in the catalogue raisonnés. But Naifeh and Smith believe the drawing was made earlier, pointing to the clumsiness of execution, the disassociation of the figures and their lack of proportion. Hulsker suggests the letter sketch was sent in response to criticism from Tersteeg:

"Tersteeg says to me: ‘Things didn’t go well for you earlier either, and it was a failure, and now it's the same all over again’. Stop right there...

It's precisely because I have a draughtsman's fist that I can’t keep myself from drawing and, I ask you, have I ever doubted or hesitated or wavered since the day I began to draw? I think you know very well that I’ve hacked my way through and am obviously ever more keen to do battle.

Coming back to that little sketch – it was made in the Geest district in the drizzle, standing in a street in the mud, in all that bustle and noise, and I’m sending it to show you that my sketchbook proves that I try to capture things first-hand. Put .. [Tersteeg] ... himself, for example, in front of a sandpit in the Geest district where the dredgers are at work laying a water or gas pipe – I’d like to see the kind of face someone like that would pull and what kind of sketch he’d make. Struggling on wharves and in alleys and streets and inside houses, waiting rooms, even public houses, that's not a nice job, unless one is an artist. As such one would rather be in the filthiest neighbourhood, provided there's something to draw, than at a tea party with nice ladies. Unless one draws ladies, in which case a tea party is nice even for an artist."

Hulsker called the signed drawing The Public Soup Kitchen (F1020a below) important and attractive. Van Gogh and Breitner had sketched together at a soup kitchen in the Geest (it is not known which of several possibilities it was). After going to the trouble and expense of installing shutters in his windows to adjust the light and to recreate the scene itself in his studio, van Gogh was able to study his models at leisure. In this way he was able to introduce more chiaroscuro (light and dark) in his drawing, which he executed with natural ('mountain') chalk that Theo had sent him and whose properties he lauds in his letters. All the models are from Sien's family: her mother and baby are on the left; her sister, back turned to us, and her daughter, hair cropped as a precaution against lice, in the center; and Sien herself, superbly executed in profile, on the right. The watercolor F1020b (top left) is much less successful as van Gogh himself acknowledged, blaming the paper in part for not being right for the job.

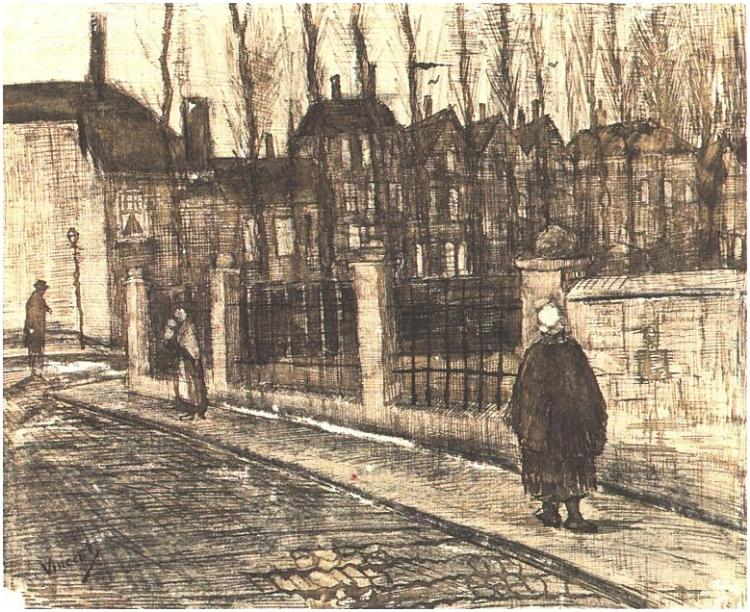
View of The Hague ('Paddemoes'), pencil, pen in black ink (faded to brown in parts), wash, on wove paper, March 1882, Kröller-Müller Museum, Otterlo (F918, JH111).

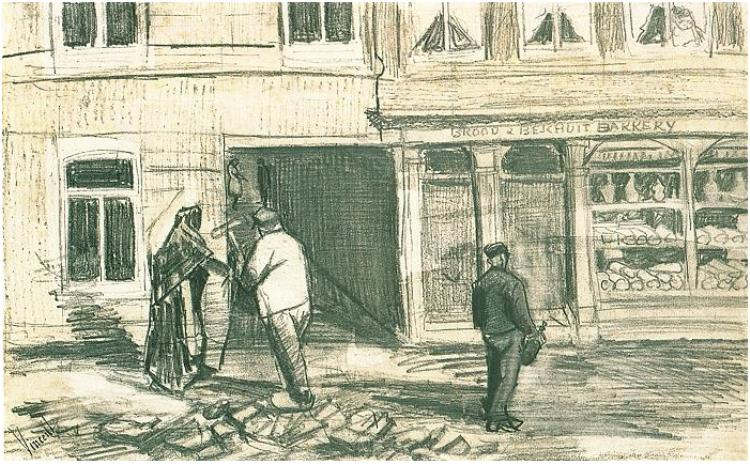
The Bakery in Noordstraat, pencil with some pen strokes, March 1882, Kunstmuseum, The Hague (F914, JH112).

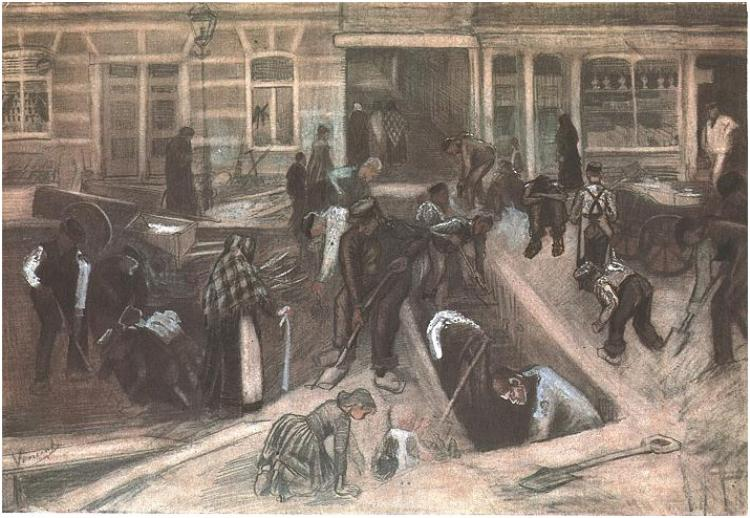
Torn-up Noordstraat with Diggers, pencil, pen, heightened with white and colour, April 1882, Kupferstichkabinett, Berlin (F930a, JH131).

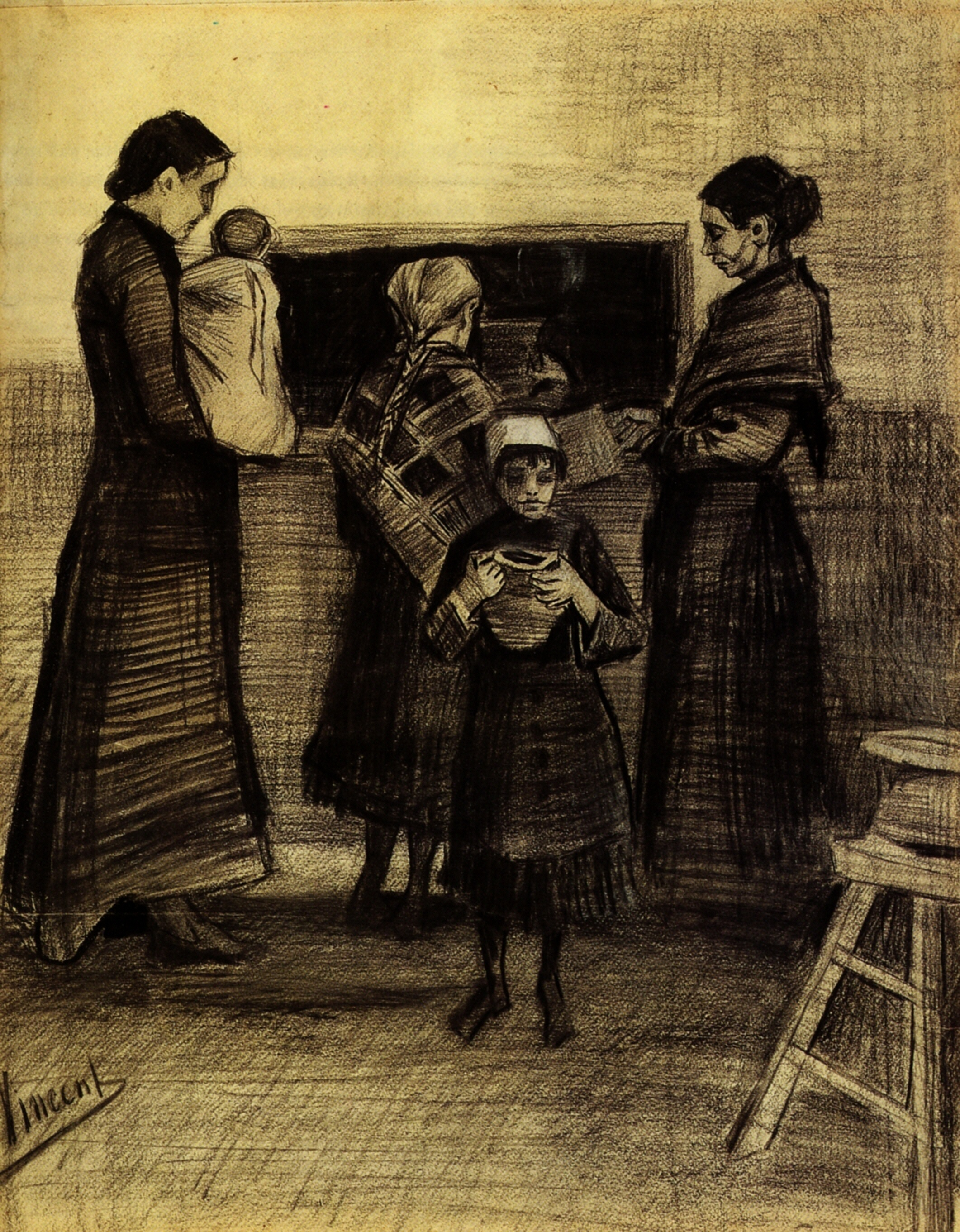
The Public Soup Kitchen, black mountain chalk, March 1882, Van Gogh Museum, Amsterdam (F1020a, JH330).

=== Haagse Bos ===
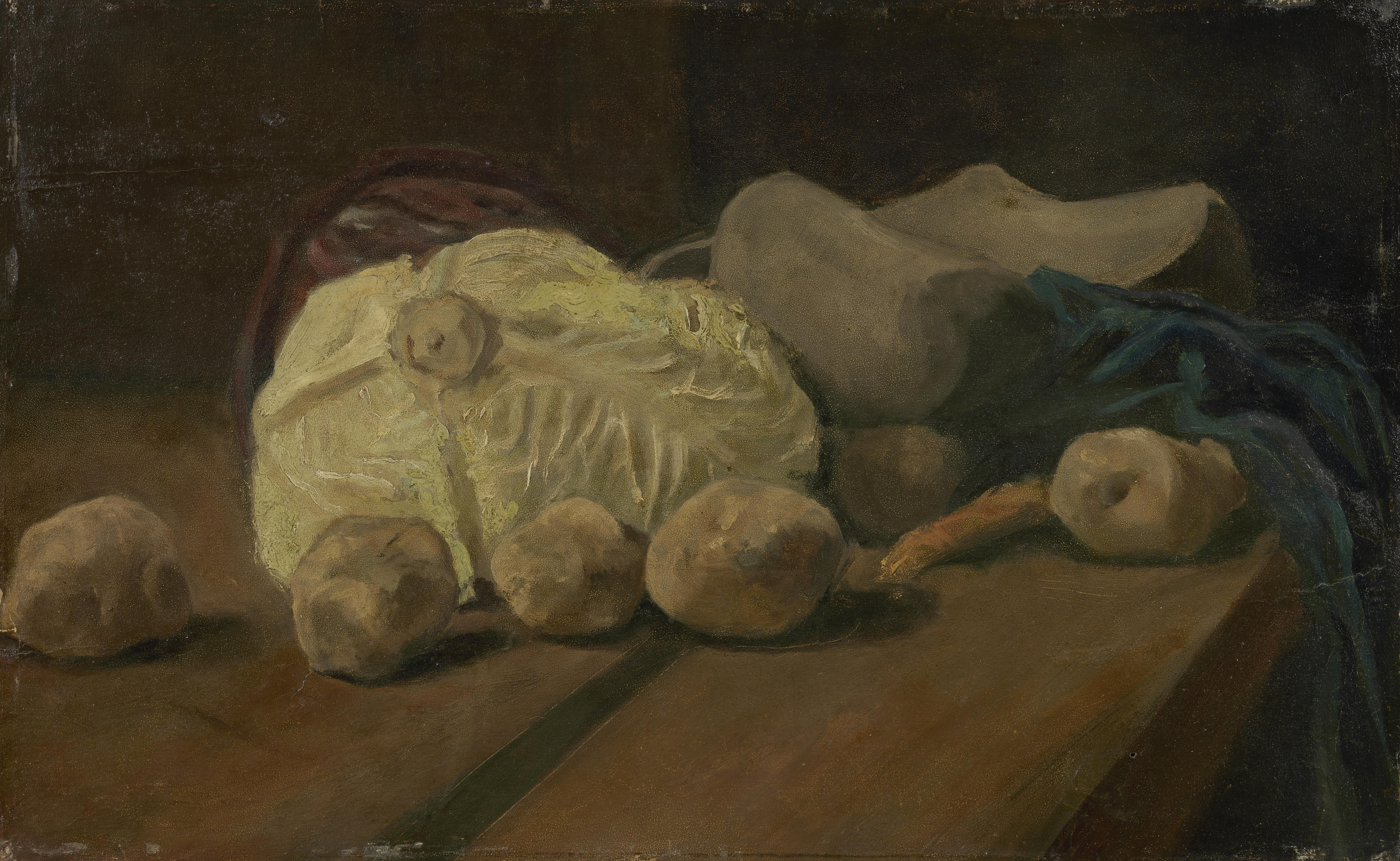
Still Life with Cabbage and Clogs, oil on paper on panel, late November-mid December, 1881, Van Gogh Museum, Amsterdam (F1, JH81). This is van Gogh's first oil painting.

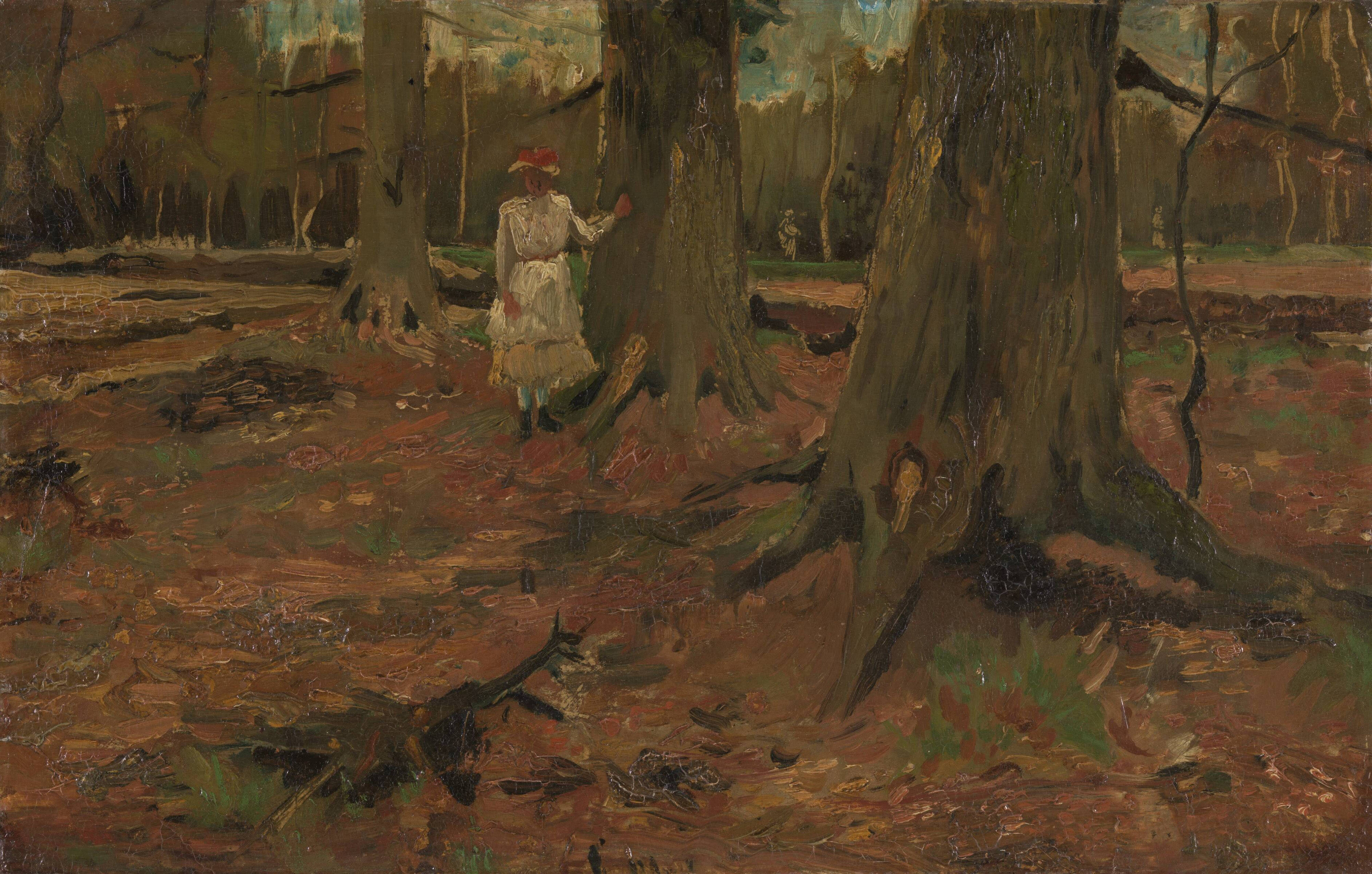
Girl in White in the Woods, oil on paper mounted on canvas, August 1882, Kröller-Müller Museum, Otterlo (F8, JH182).

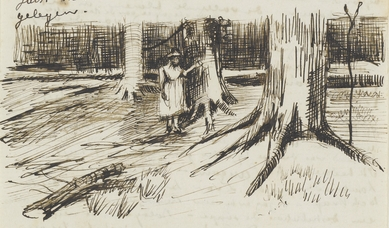
Sketch in letter 261.

Van Gogh abandoned his initial efforts at oil painting (left) in January 1882 because he did not feel confident enough in his drawing technique. However Theo was anxious van Gogh should start producing saleable work, and following a visit from Theo in August 1882, encouraging him and giving him the money to buy paints and equipment, van Gogh took it up again. He chose his initial subjects from the woods near him, the Haagse Bos, and from the dunes and beaches at Scheveningen, The Hague. These initial studies were all on made on paper pinned to a drawing board because stretching a canvas was too expensive, although some were subsequently mounted on canvas.

"I don’t know myself how I paint. I sit with a white board before the spot that strikes me — I look at what's before my eyes — I say to myself, this white board must become something — I come back, dissatisfied — I put it aside, and after I’ve rested a little, feeling a kind of fear, I take a look at it — then I’m still dissatisfied — because I have that marvellous nature too much in mind for me to be satisfied — but still, I see in my work an echo of what struck me, I see that nature has told me something, has spoken to me and that I’ve written it down in shorthand. In my shorthand there may be words that are indecipherable — errors or gaps — yet something remains of what the wood or the beach or the figure said — and it isn’t a tame or conventional language which doesn’t stem from nature itself but from a studied manner or a system."

== See also ==
- List of works by Vincent van Gogh

== Bibliography ==
- de la Faille, Jacob-Baart. The Works of Vincent van Gogh: His Paintings and Drawings. Amsterdam: Meulenhoff, 1970. ISBN 978-1556608117
- Hulsker, Jan. The Complete Van Gogh. Oxford: Phaidon, 1980. ISBN 0-7148-2028-8
- Naifeh, Steven; Smith, Gregory White. Van Gogh: The Life. Profile Books, 2011. ISBN 978-1846680106
- Pomerans, Arnold. The Letters of Vincent van Gogh. Penguin Classics, 2003. ISBN 978-0140446746
- Zemel, Carol. Van Gogh's Progress: Utopia, Modernity and Late-Nineteenth-Century Art. Berkely:University of California Press 1997. ISBN 0520088492
