= Adrianus Jacobus Zuyderland =

Model of Vincent van Gogh

Coordinates: 52.0719°N 4.3067°E

Orphan Man with Top Hat
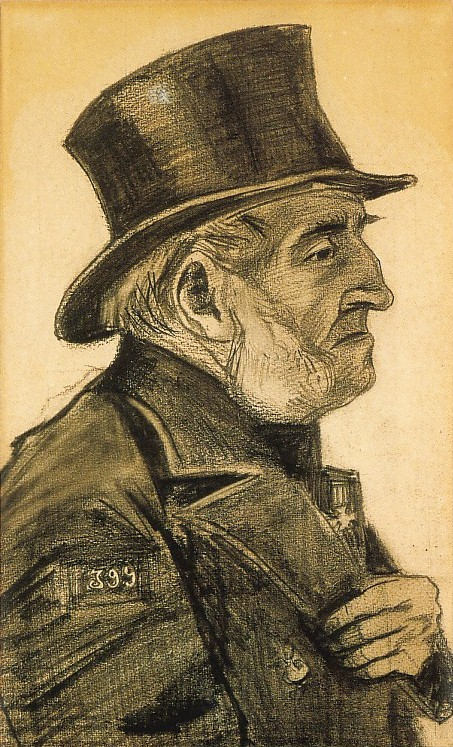
- Artist: Vincent van Gogh
- Year: 1882
- Type: Graphite drawing with white heightening on cream wove paper
- Dimensions: 40 cm × 24.5 cm (15.7 in × 9.6 in)
- Location: Worcester Art Museum, Worcester, Massachusetts, (F954, JH287).

Adrianus Jacobus Zuyderland was Vincent van Gogh's favorite model during his Hague period. He appears in dozens of drawings, easily identified by his bald head and prominent white whiskers, and he was the model for the drawing which was the basis for van Gogh's later iconic painting At Eternity's Gate.

== Background ==
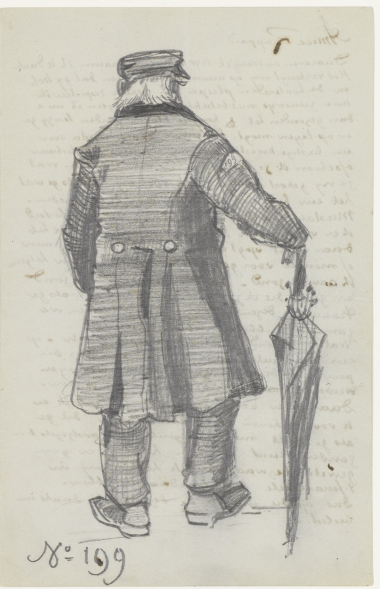
Orphan Man with Long Overcoat and Umbrella, Seen from the Back, sketch in letter 268 (R14), September 1882, Private collection, United States (JH214).

A. J. Zuyderland was born at The Hague ca. 1810 and fought in the Ten days' campaign in 1831 against the Belgian secessionists and French troops supporting them, where he received nl:Metalen Kruis 1830-1831 award, which he usually wears on his portraits. He registered at an almshouse in 1876.

He is first mentioned by van Gogh in a letter to Anthon van Rappard, dated around 19 September 1882: "... I’ve also been painting and watercoloring, and in addition I’m drawing many figures from the model as well as scratches [i.e. 'sketches'] on the street. Lately I’ve quite often had a man from the Old Men’s Home to pose.

The "Old Men's Home" was the Nederlands Hervormd Oude-mannen-en-vrouwenhuis in the Om en Bij, The Hague, and Zuyderland was subsequently identified by W. J. A. Visser in their records from the identification tab 399 on his right arm that can be made out in Orphan Man with Top Hat, and which also appears in a letter sketch (left).
