= Church Pew with Worshippers =

1882 painting by Vincent van Gogh

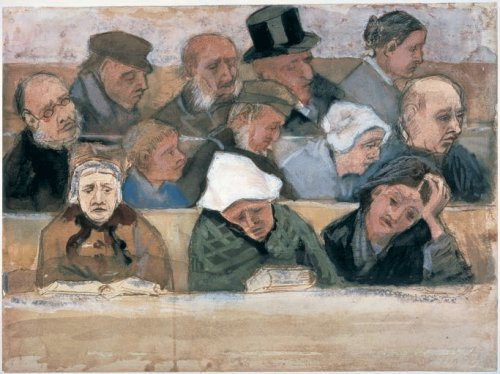
- Location: Kröller-Müller Museum

Church Pew with Worshippers is a watercolor created in September–October 1882 by Vincent van Gogh. A sketch of the painting was included in a letter van Gogh sent to his brother Theo that mentions the work.

== See also ==
- Early works of Vincent van Gogh
- List of drawings by Vincent van Gogh
- List of works by Vincent van Gogh
