= Benoordenhout =

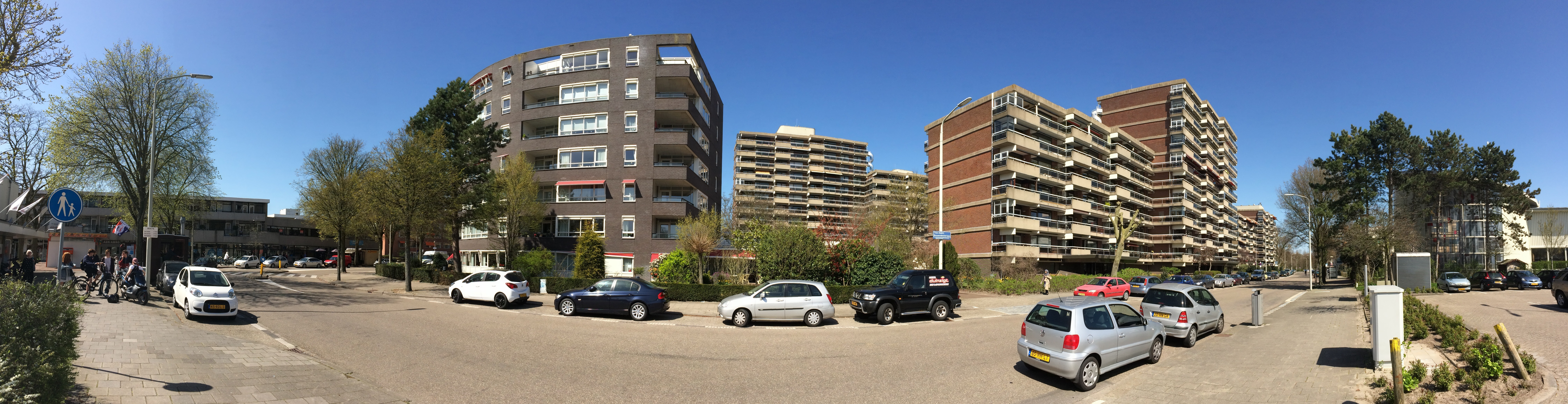

- Location of Benoordenhout in The Hague
- Coordinates: 52°05′57″N 4°19′33″E
- Country: Netherlands
- Province: South Holland
- Municipality: The Hague
- District: Haagse Hout

Area
  - Total: 2.78 km^{2} (1.07 sq mi)
  - Land: 2.70 km^{2} (1.04 sq mi)
  - Water: 0.08 km^{2} (0.031 sq mi)

Population (1 January 2020)
  - Total: 14,347
  - Density: 5,310/km^{2} (13,800/sq mi)

Benoordenhout (Dutch pronunciation: [bəˈnoːrdə(n)ˌɦʌut]) is a neighbourhood in the Haagse Hout district of The Hague. In addition to Benoordenhout, Haagse Hout consists of the Bezuidenhout, Mariahoeve en Marlot, and Haagse Bos neighbourhoods.

Benoordenhout is located northeast of the city centre and is enclosed by the Koningskade, Raamweg, the Hubertuspark, the barracks and dunes north of the Waalsdorperweg, the city's border with Wassenaar, the Haagse Bos (The Hague Woods) and Malieveld.

The neighbourhood gets its name from the Haagse Bos. In Dutch, 'Benoorden' means 'situated north of' and 'hout' is an archaic term for forest. In modern Dutch, 'hout' solely refers to the material wood.

Benoordenhout is in turn divided into seven areas: the Nassaubuurt, Uilennest, Duinzigt, Waalsdorp, Arendsdorp, Clingendael and the area around the exclusive Van Hoytemastraat shopping street.

== History ==
The Benoordenhout was built almost completely during the twentieth century. Few buildings existed before 1900, the most notable being the buildings in Clingendael and Arendsdorp. As can be seen on historical maps only the area between Koningskade and Jan van Nassaustraat, in today's Nassaubuurt, had residential buildings.

By 1920, some buildings had been added, including the Shell headquarters at the Carel van Bylandtlaan. Between 1920 and 1940, houses were built up to the Alkemadelaan and the Waalsdorperweg, and in Duinzigt even beyond the Alkemadelaan. With the German invasion in 1940, construction stopped; only a few buildings were added, most notably the Julianakazerne barracks. Unlike in the Bezuidenhout, the damage resulting from the war was limited.

Uilennest was completed after the war. The sixties and seventies saw the construction of the eastern part of Duinzigt, the Bronovo hospital, the Nebo nursing home, and the ANWB headquarters. The zoo, which had been closed since 1943, made way for the building of the provincial administration in 1968.

Mark Rutte lived in an apartment in the neighbourhood before, during and after his tenure as prime minister of the Netherlands.

== Gallery ==
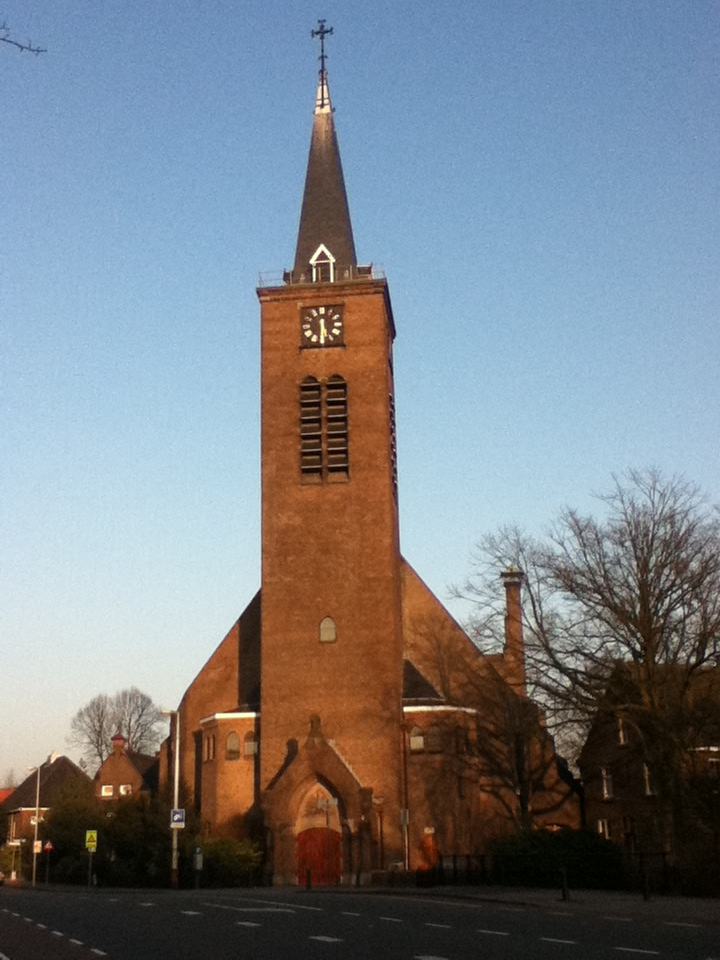
Church of Saint Paschal Baylon (1919-1921), designed by Dutch traditionalist architect Alexander Kropholler

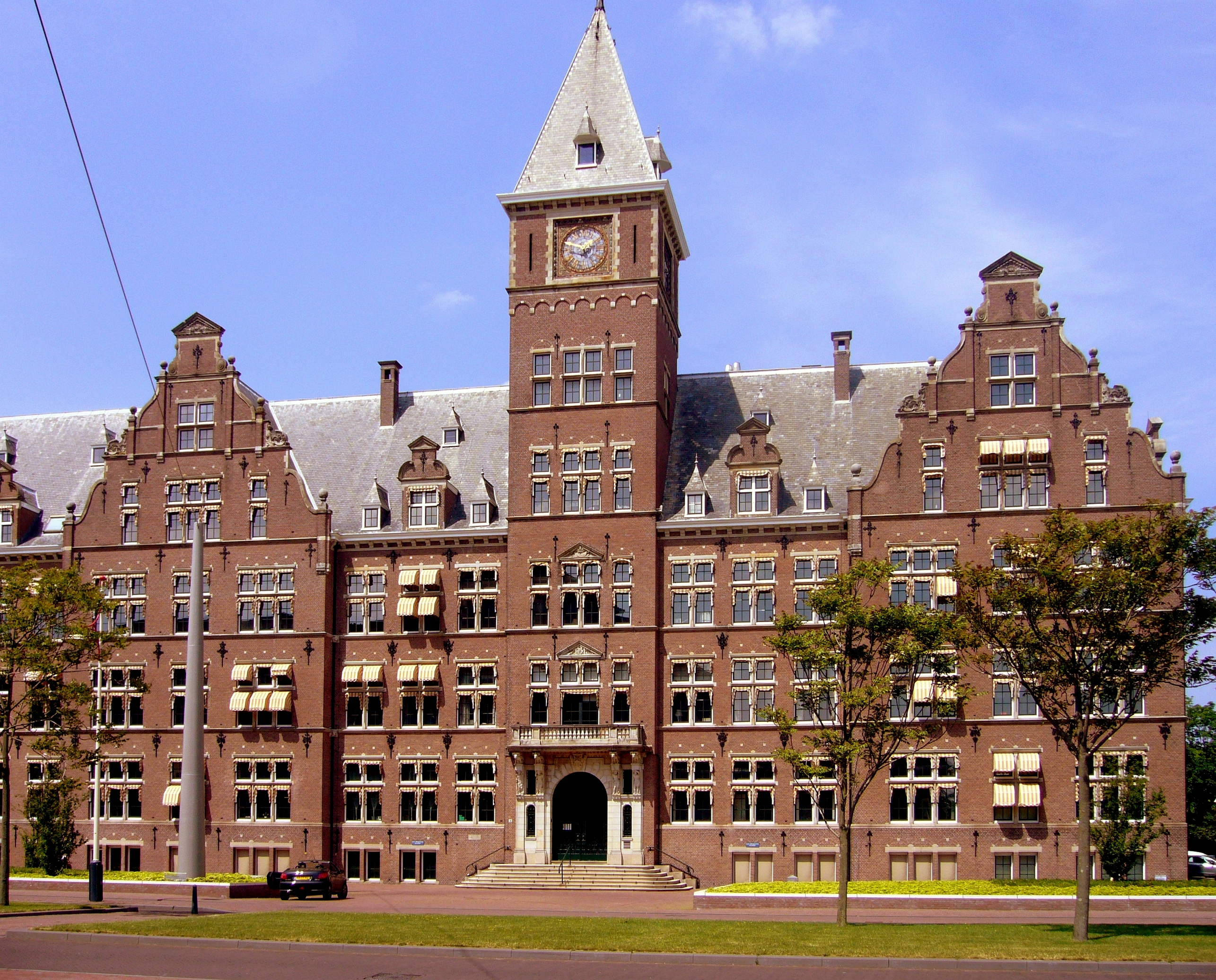
Global headquarters of Royal Dutch Shell at Carel van Bylandtlaan (1928-1930)

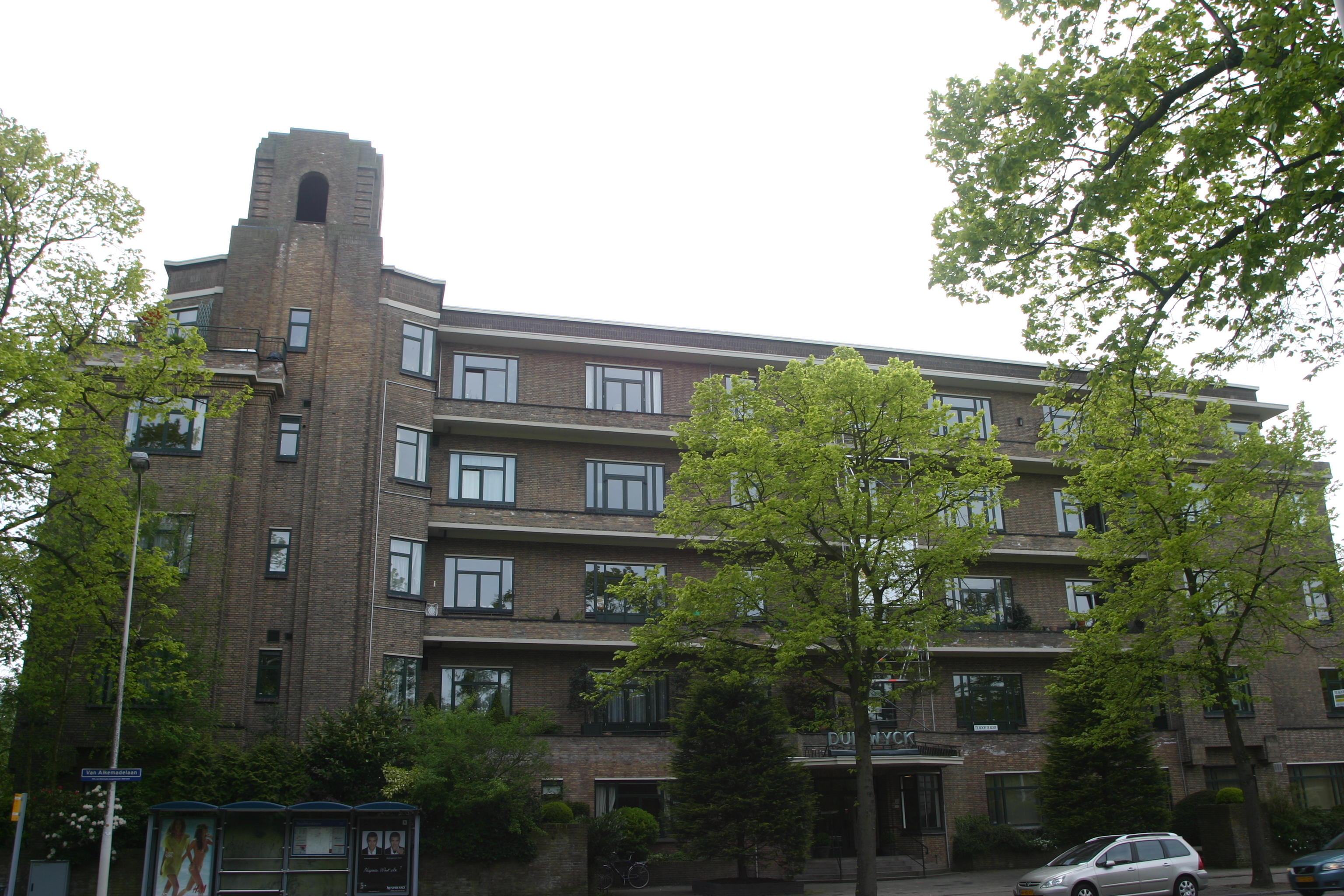
Duinwyck, an apartment building at Van Alkemadelaan (1929-1932)

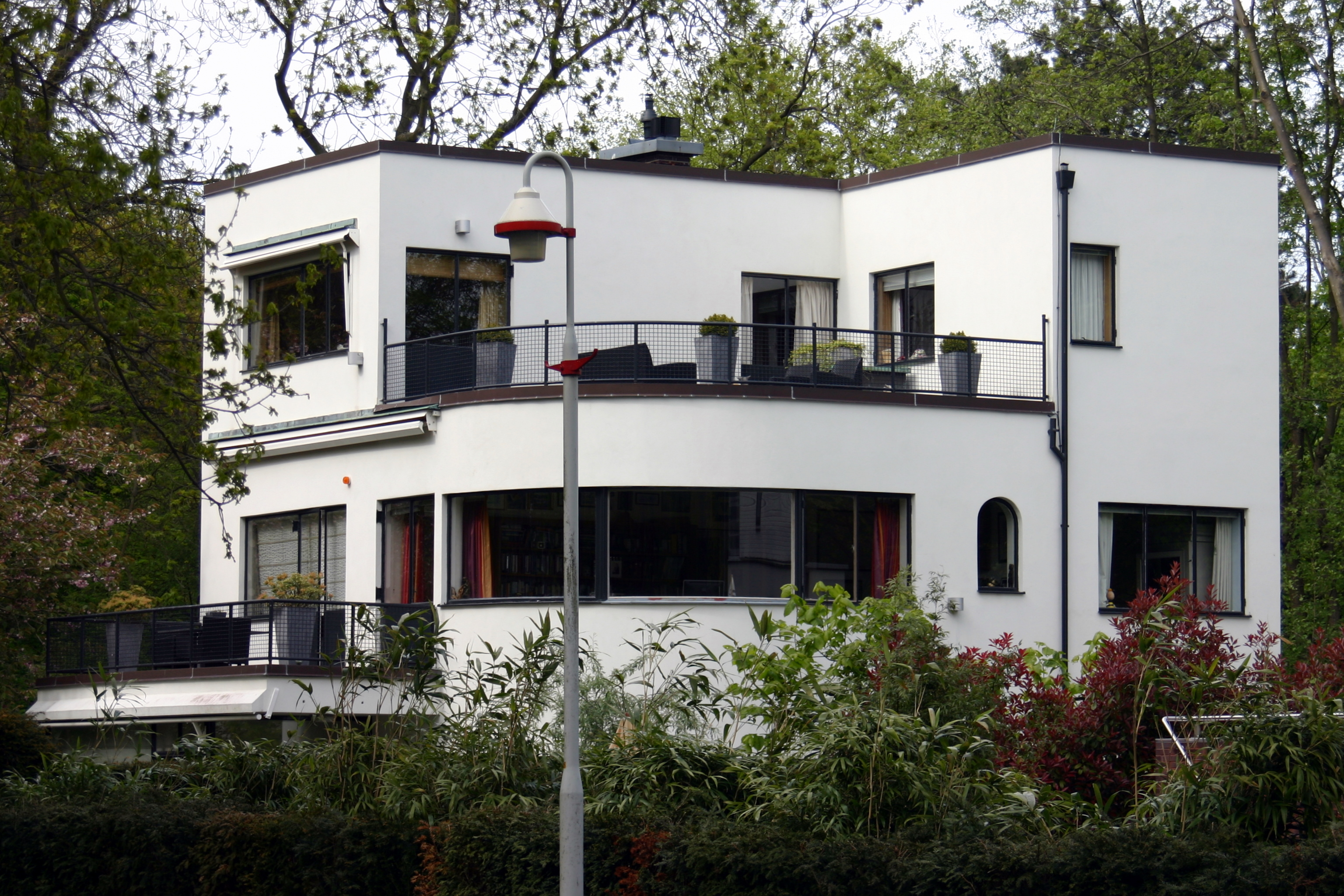
Hartog House at Van Soutelandelaan (1937-1938)

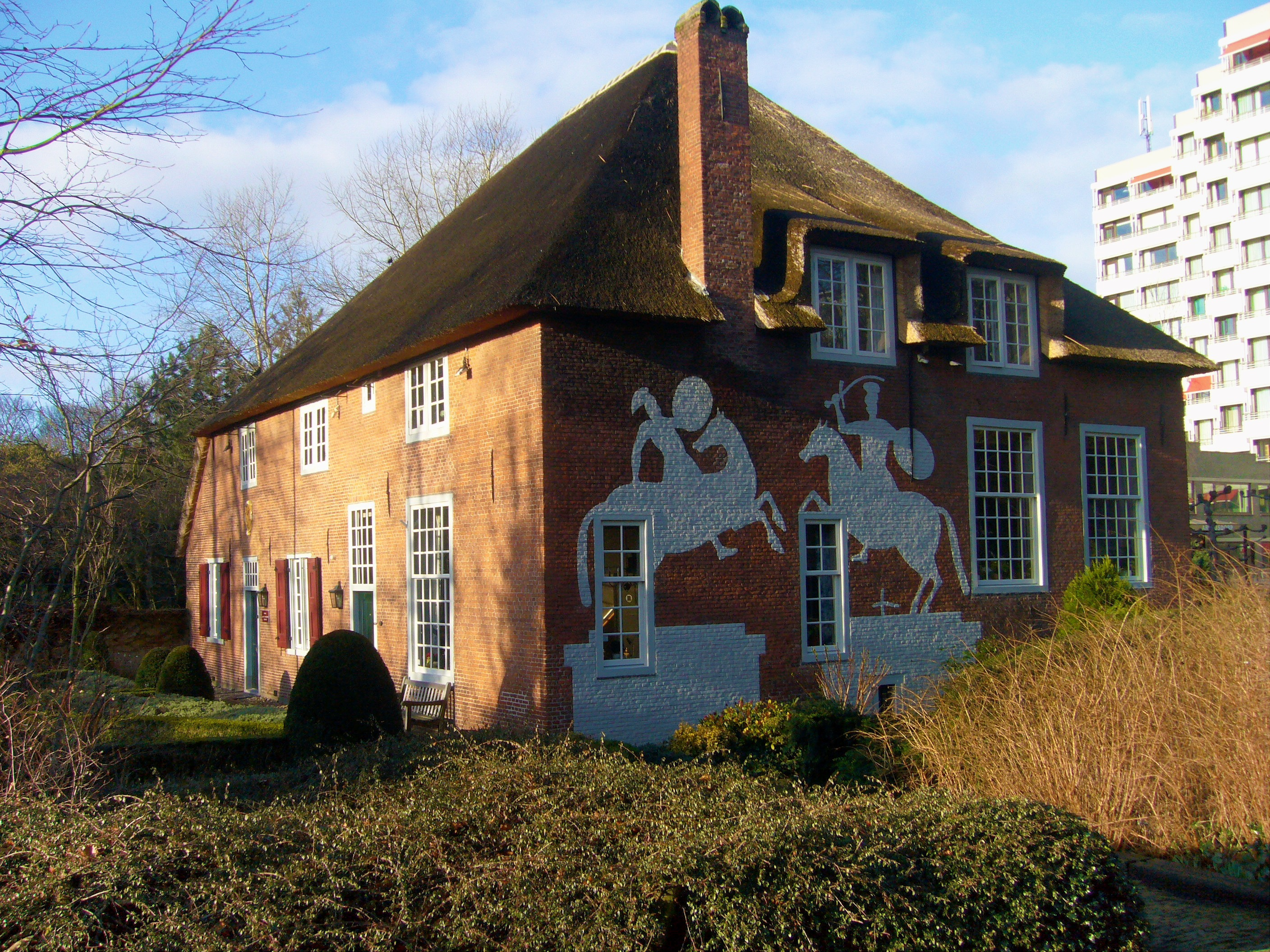
Former farmhouse, constructed around the year 1700, at the Arendsdorp estate, now embedded within the city fabric

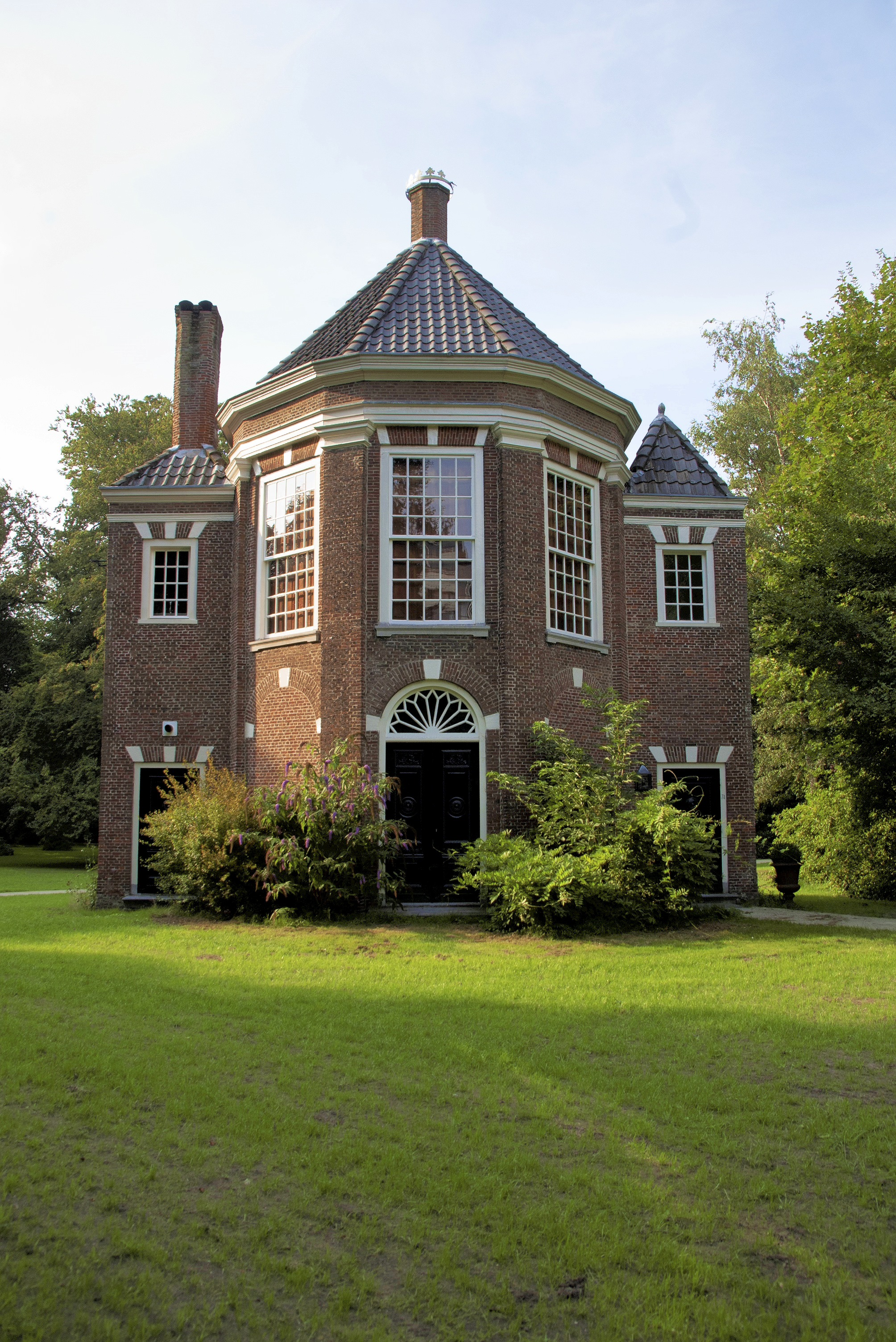
Former garden/tea house of Arendsdorp estate, constructed in approximately 1750

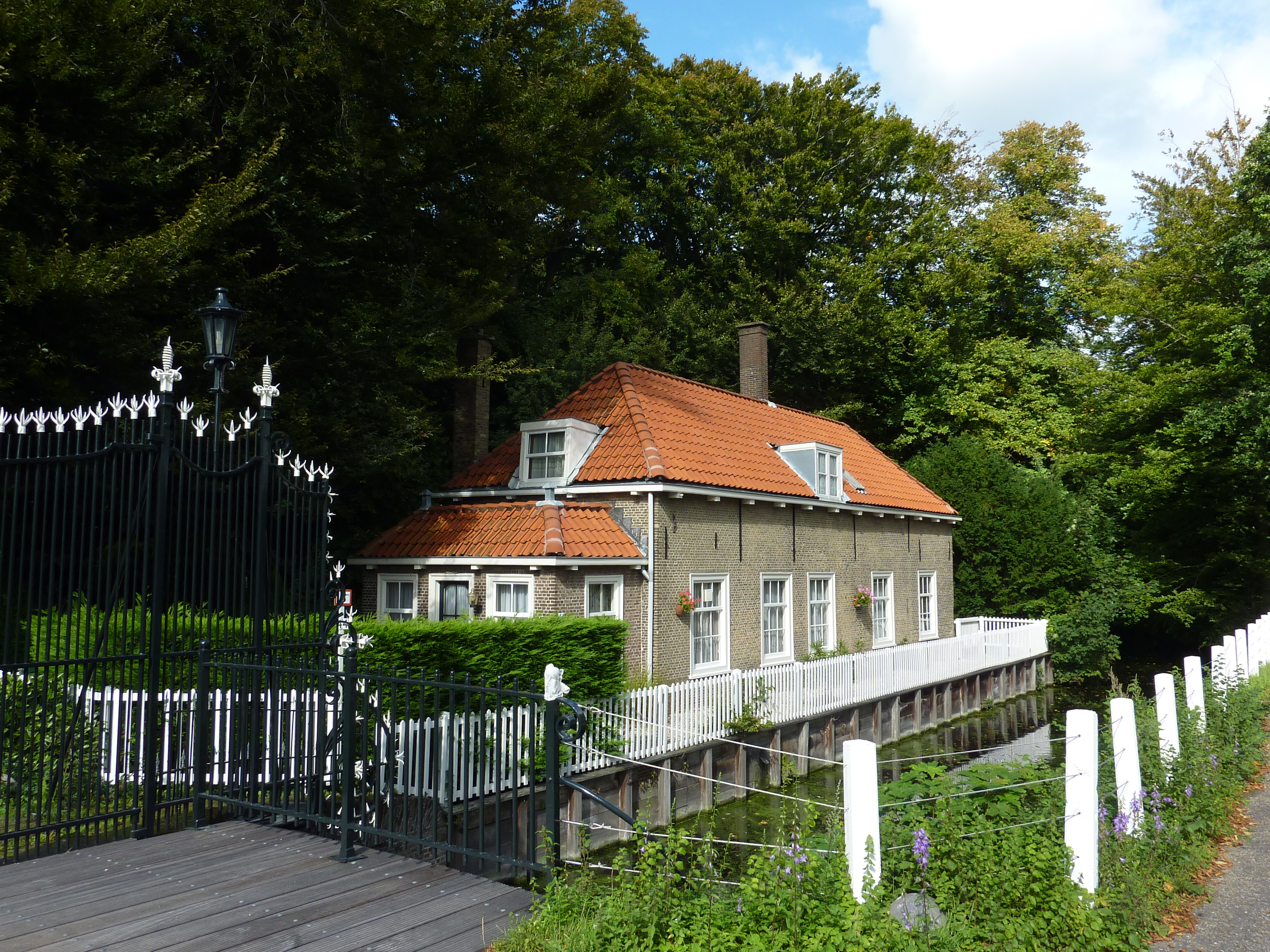
Former gatekeepers house, constructed around the year 1700, at the Oostduin estate, now giving access to a public park

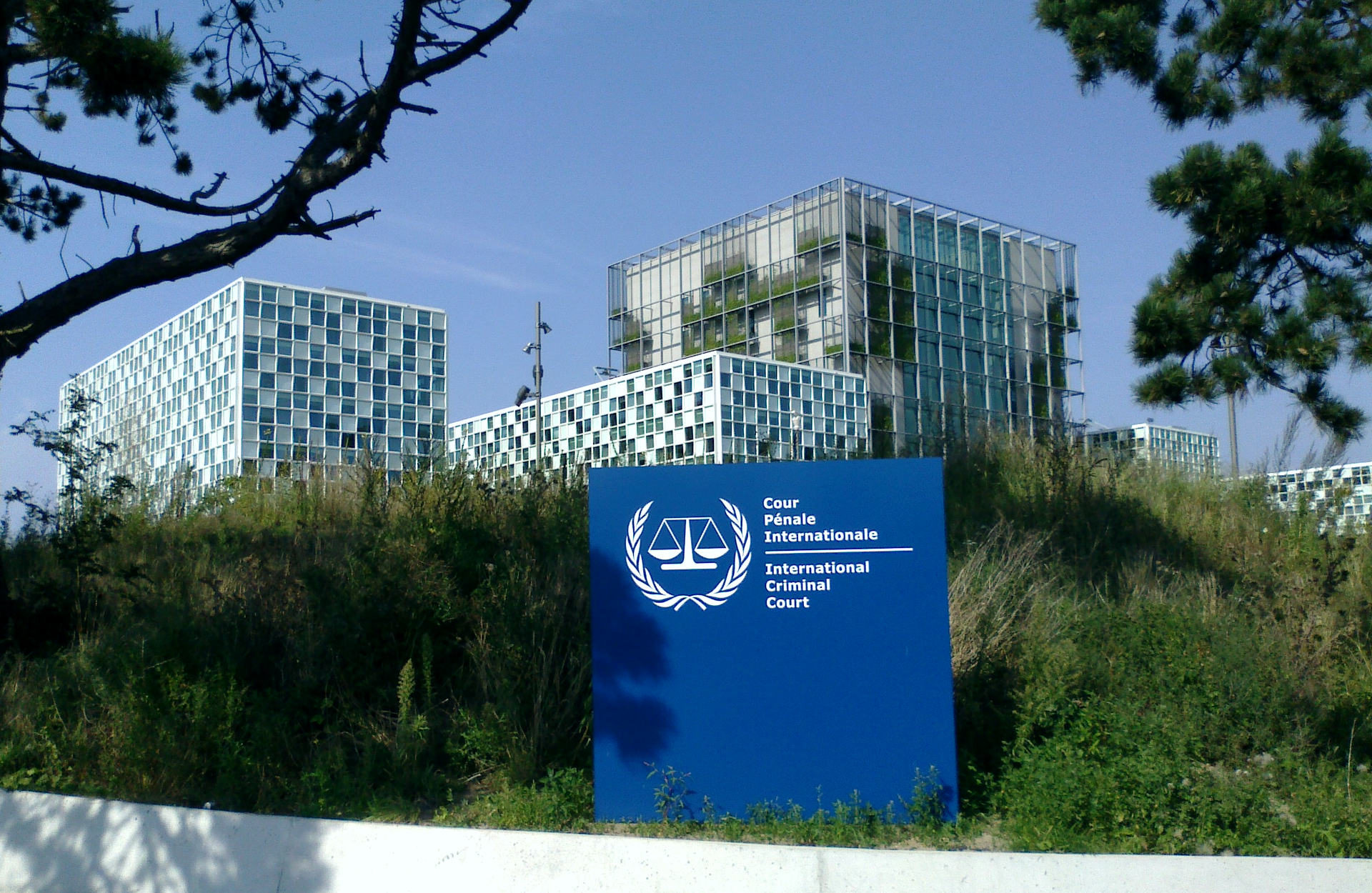
Seat of the International Criminal Court, on the edge of Benoordenhout at the dunes of Scheveningen

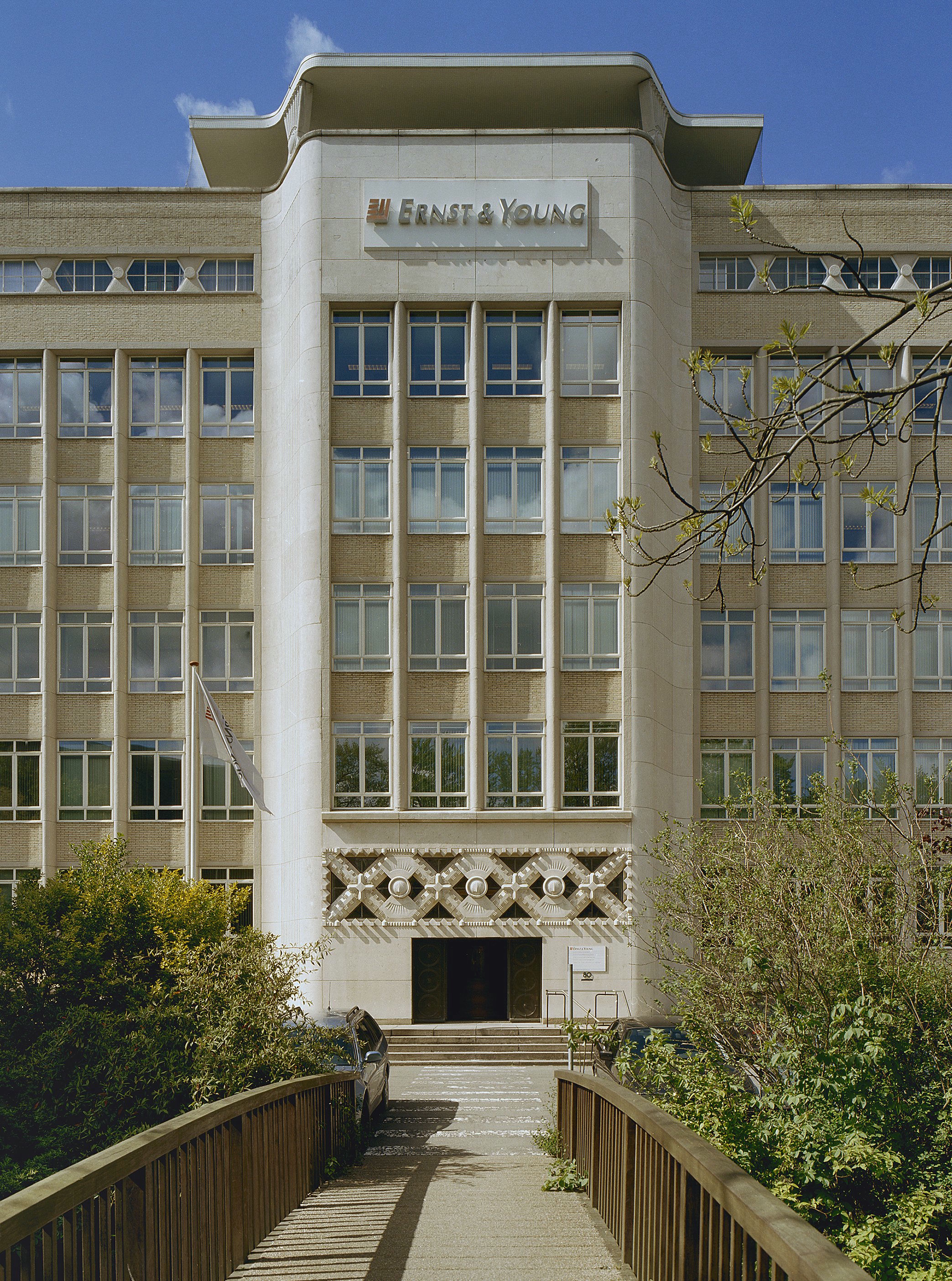
Office building at Wassenaarseweg, constructed 1938-1942 and completed 1946, designed by Jacobus Oud

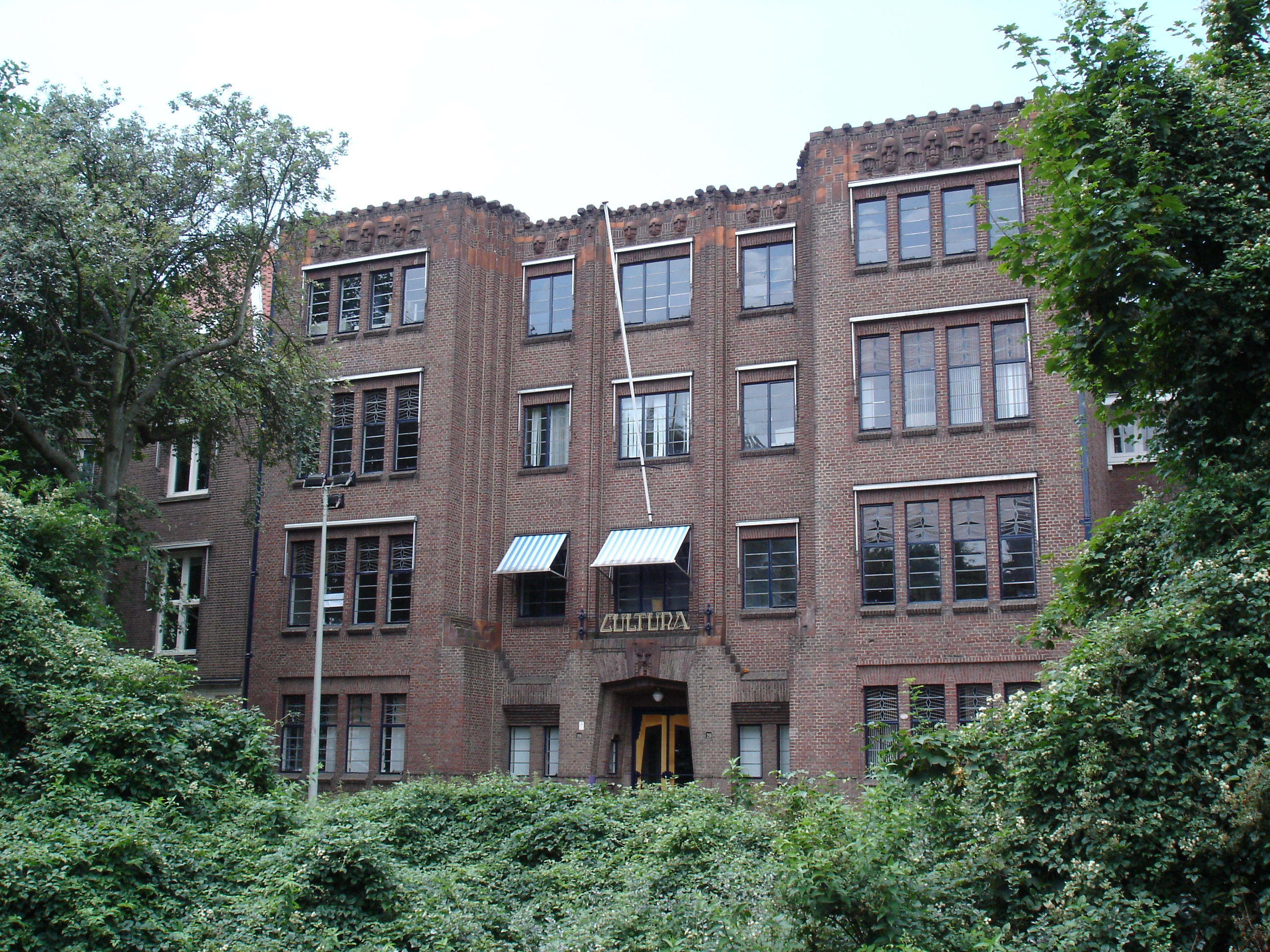
Cultura building at Wassenaarseweg (1920-1921)

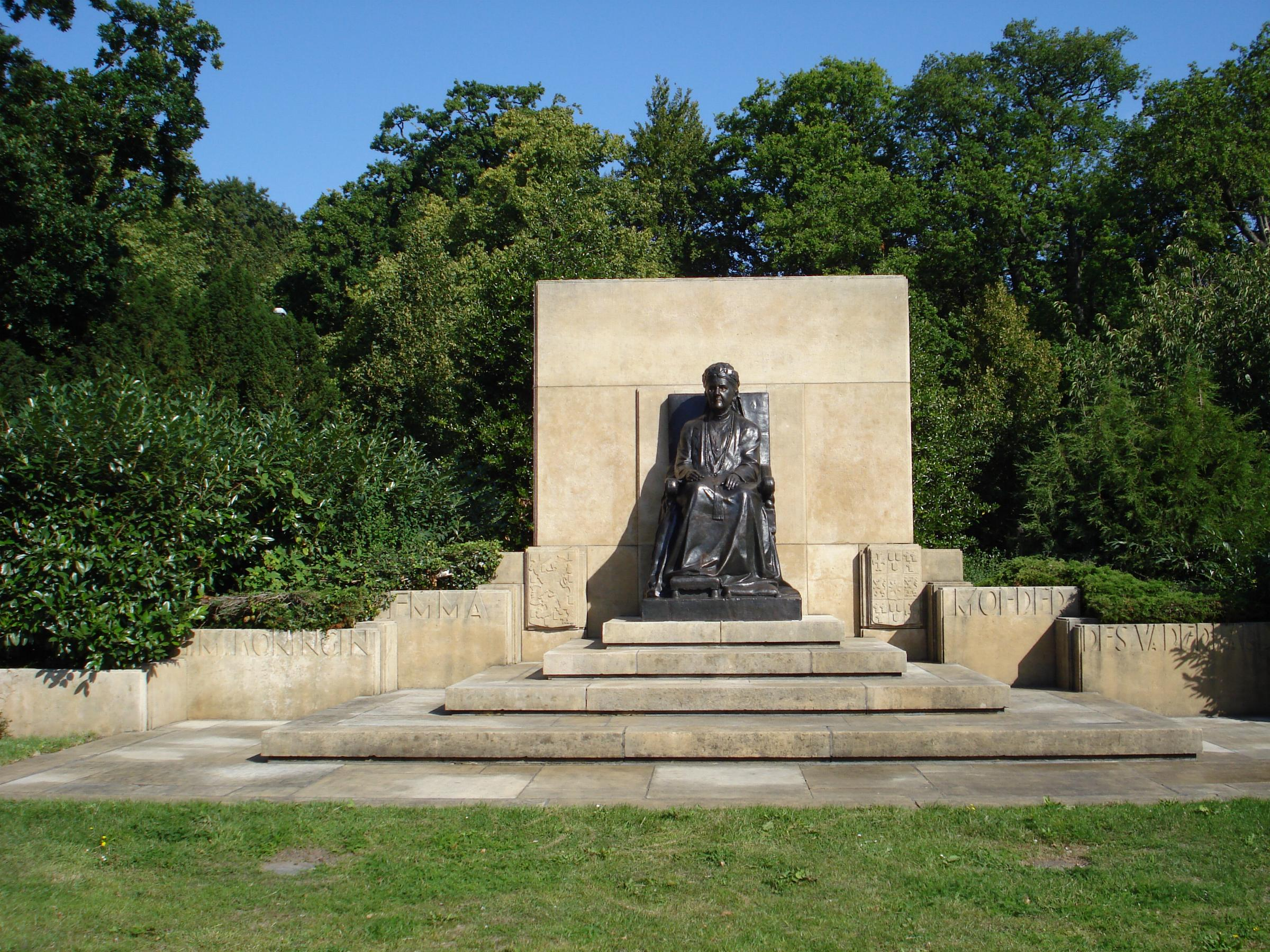
Queen Emma memorial (1935) at the “Rosarium” or Rose garden

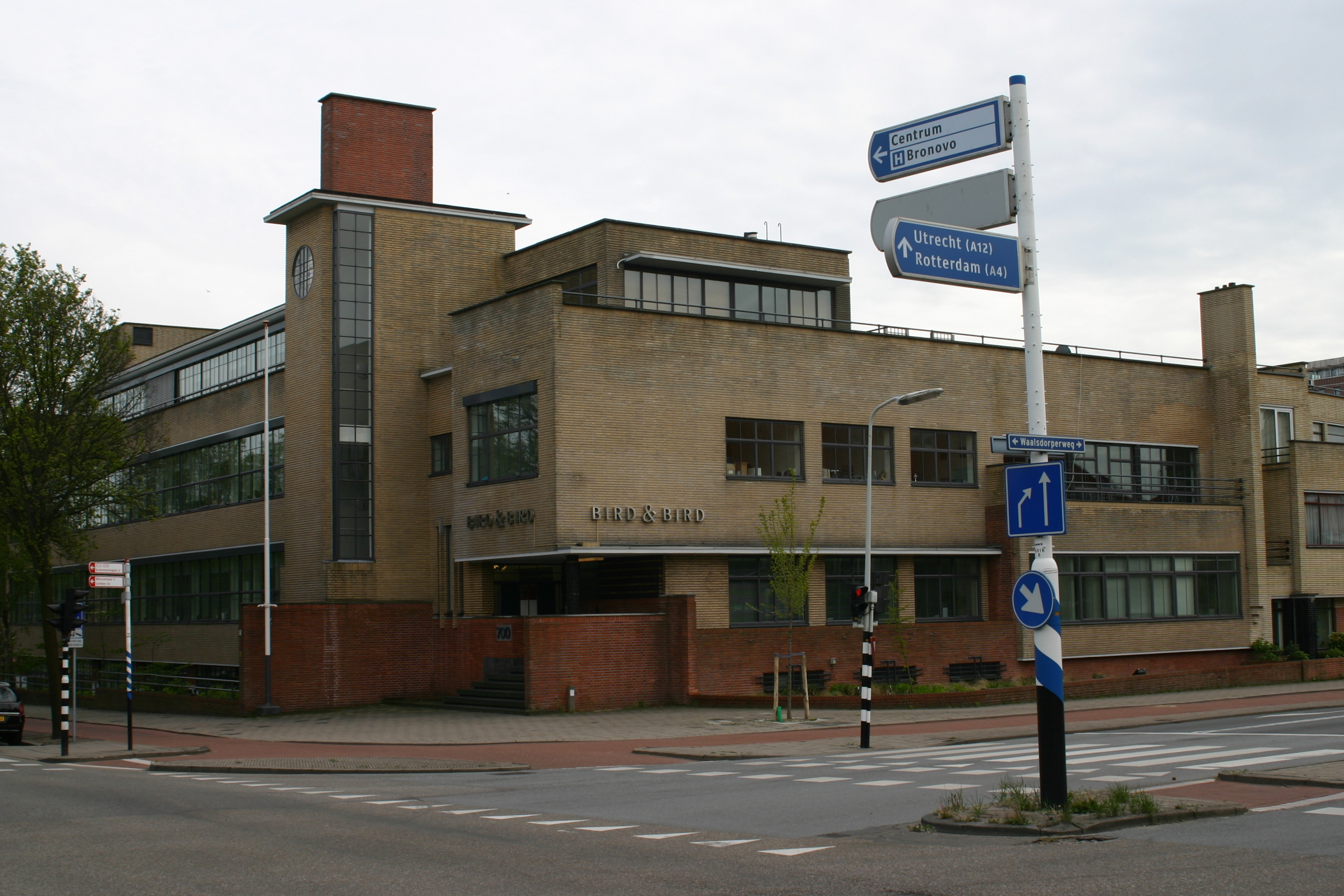
Office building at Van Alkemadelaan (1933-1935 and 1949-1950), designed by Jan Wils

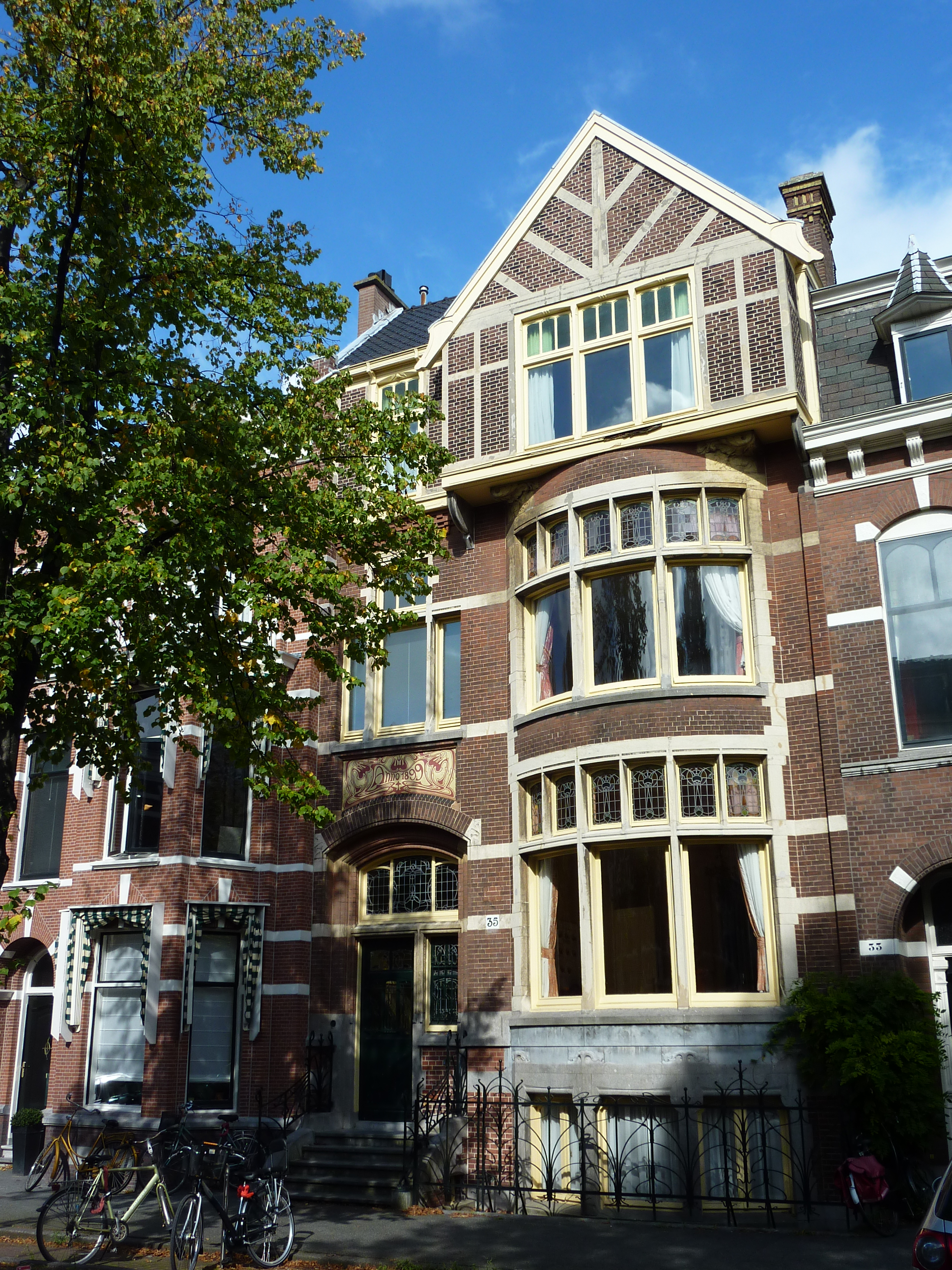
Gentleman residence at Jan van Nassaustraat (1899) designed in eclectic architecture

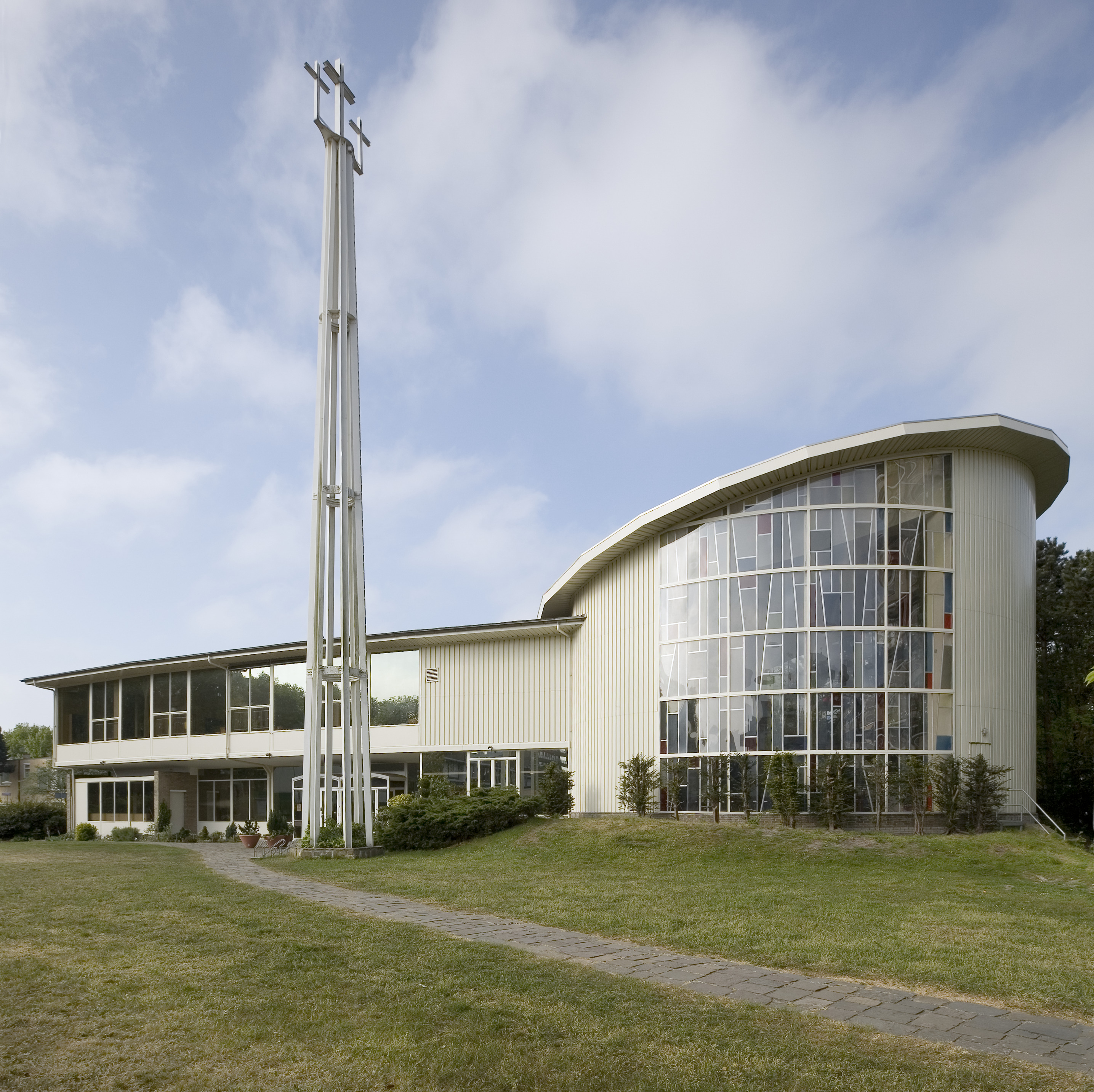
American Protestant Church, originally exhibited at the Brussels World's Fair of 1958, deconstructed in 1962 and reconstructed in The Hague

== See also ==
- Neuhuyskade
