= American Protestant Church (The Hague) =

Coordinates: 52°06′18″N 4°19′32″E

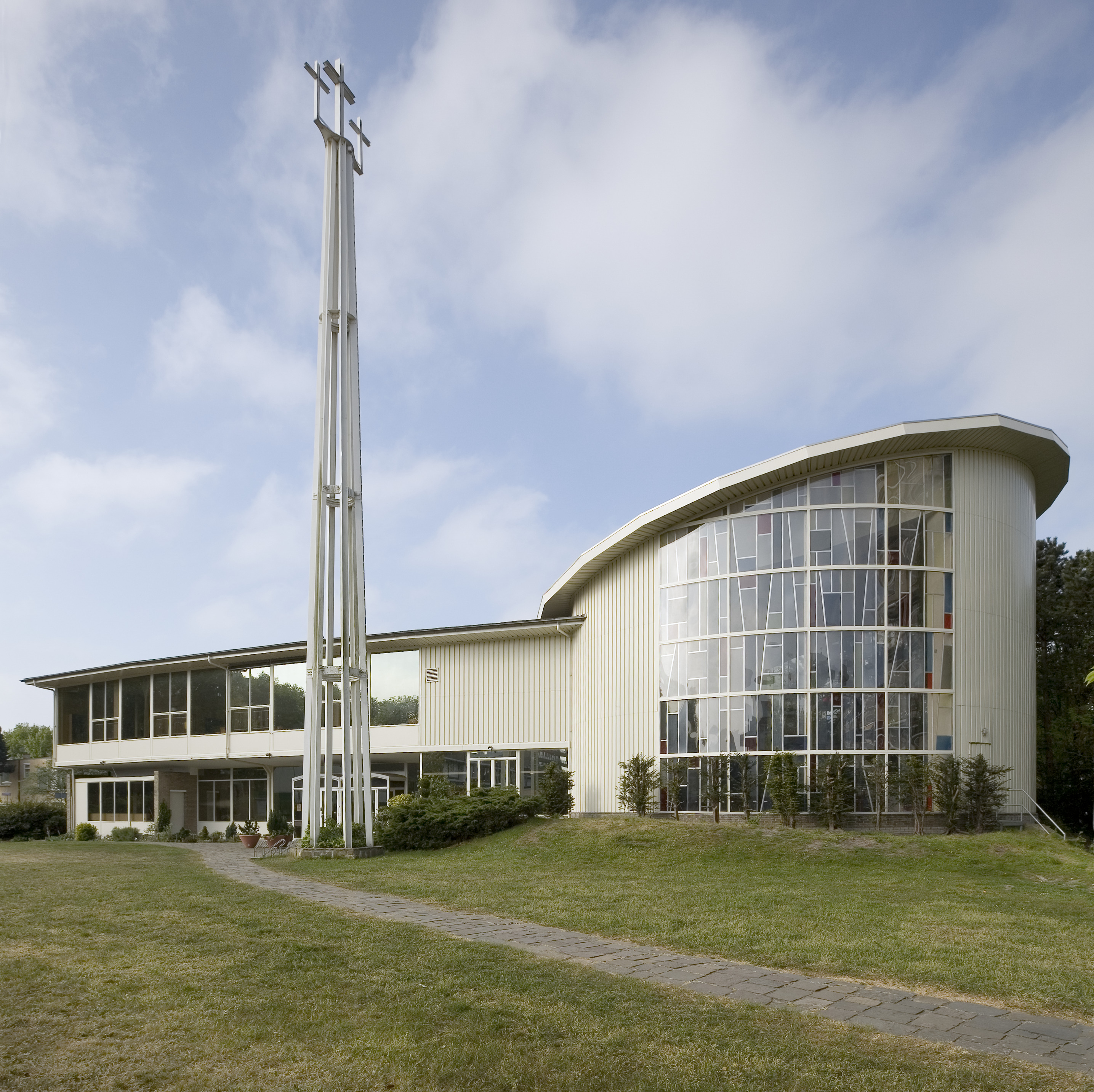
- American Protestant Church
- Location: The Hague
- Country: Netherlands
- Denomination: Protestant
- Website: https://apch.nl/

History
- Status: Church

Architecture
- Heritage designation: Rijksmonument
- Designated: April 24, 2015
- Architect: Paul Calame-Rosset

The American Protestant Church is a Protestant church building from 1958 in The Hague, Netherlands. It was originally built as a pavilion of Expo 58 in Brussels and later moved to The Hague. It was designated as a reconstruction-period Rijksmonument on April 24, 2015.

== History ==
This building was originally constructed as the Protestant pavilion of the 1958 World's fair in Brussels, and was designed by the Swiss-Belgian architect Paul Calame-Rosset. There, the pavilion served to show the Protestant faith to the public, and it was used to hold church services for visitors of the World's fair.

The American Protestant community in The Hague needed its own church building in the late 1950s. The American Women's Club of The Hague successfully fundraised to acquire the pavilion. It was dismantled, stored in Brussels, and then rebuilt in the Benoordenhout neighbourhood on the edge of The Hague, near the dunes. The Dutch architect M.M. Immerzeel led this project and added an extension for the social activities of the community. On April 8, 1962, the building was officially dedicated and put into use by the American Protestant Church.

It is the only church building in the Netherlands that previously served as a pavilion for a world exhibition.

== Description ==
The building uses mainly industrial materials, and consists of a prefabricated structure with an aluminum facade. The large windows are made from coloured plexiglass.

Next to the complex there is a hexagonal metal pylon with three crosses, which refer to those of the place Golgotha, to Jesus Christ's death on the cross and resurrection. At the South facade, another 3 meters high cross is mounted, which hung above the church altar during the 1958 World's Fair.

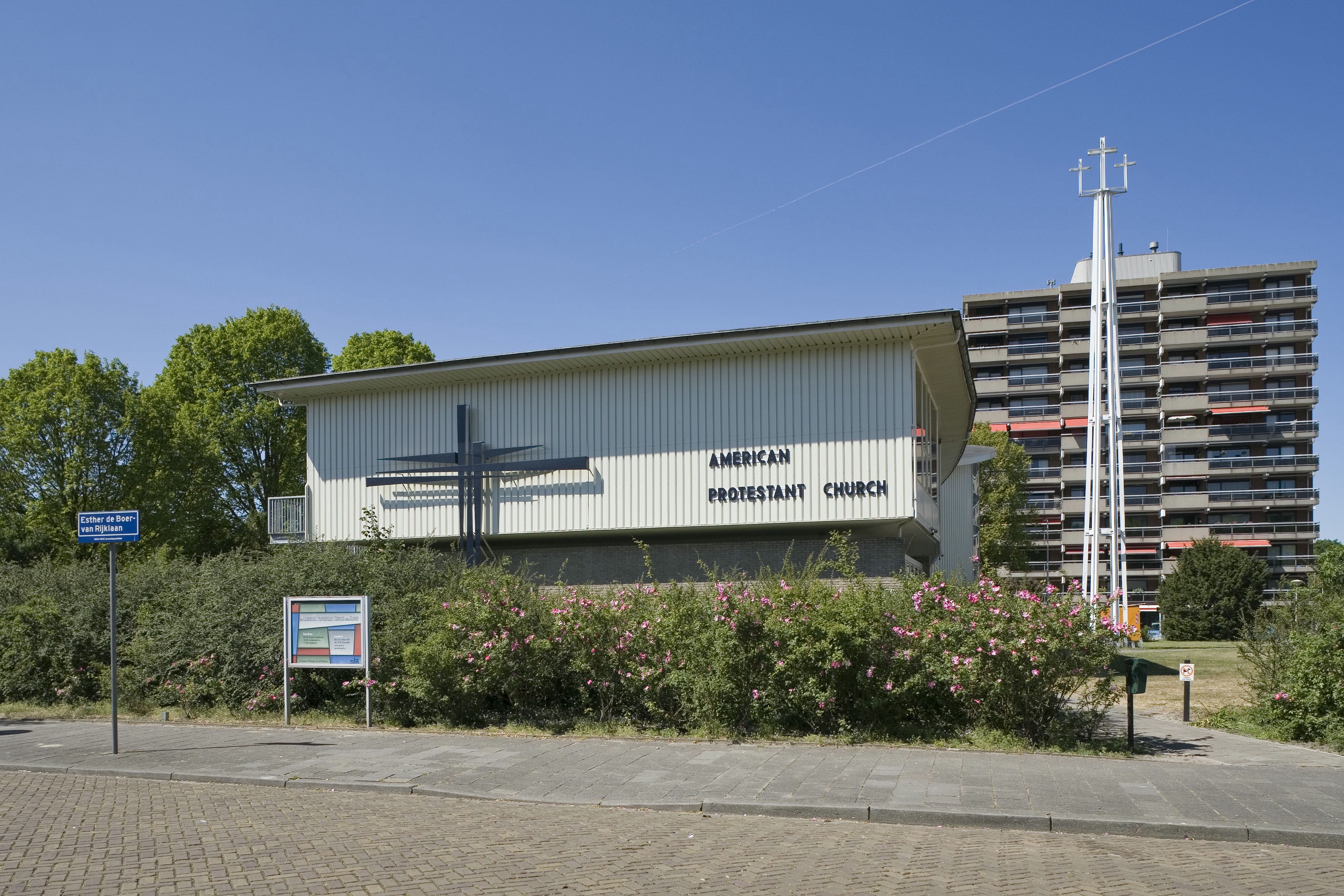
South facade with cross, 2007.

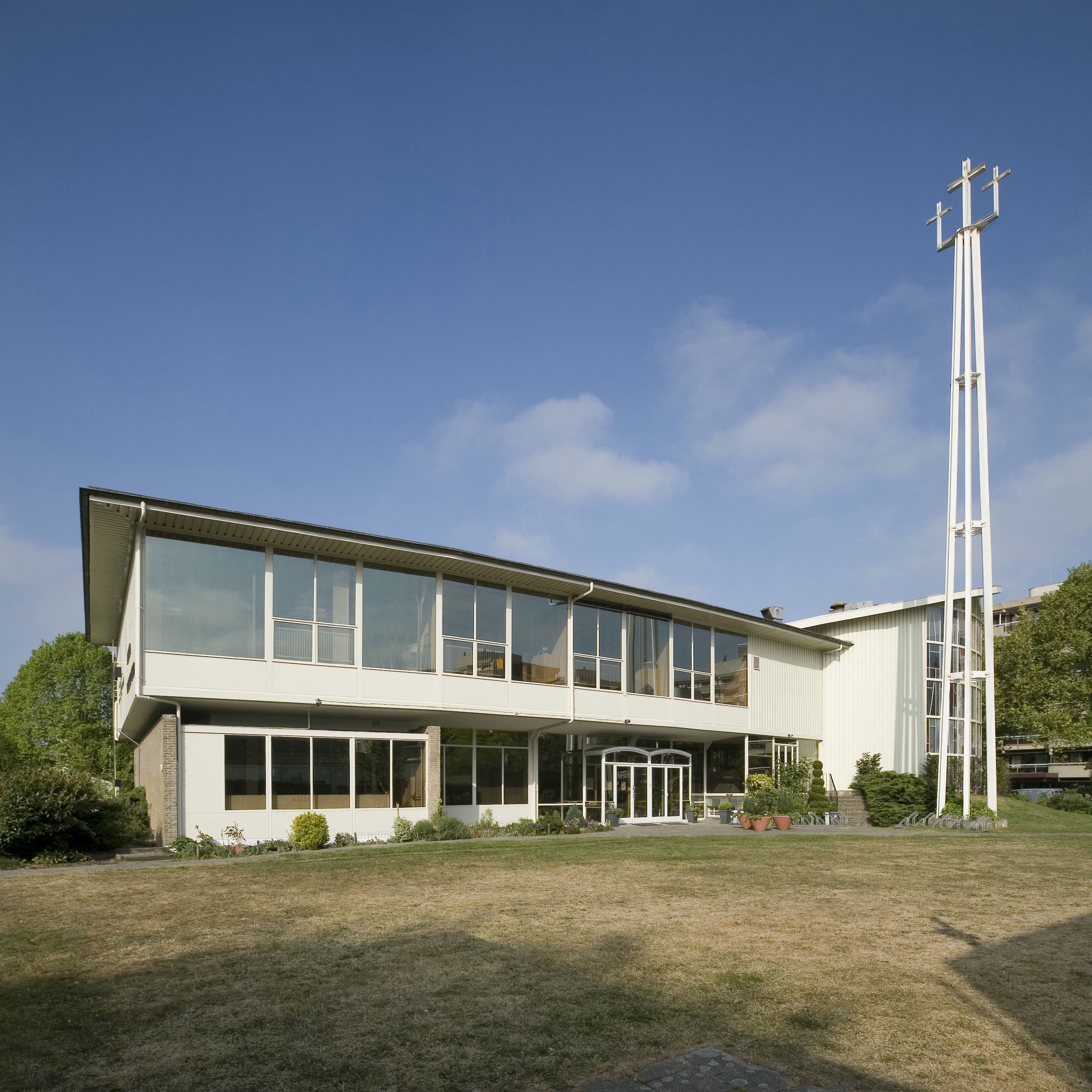
Overview of the West facade, 2007.

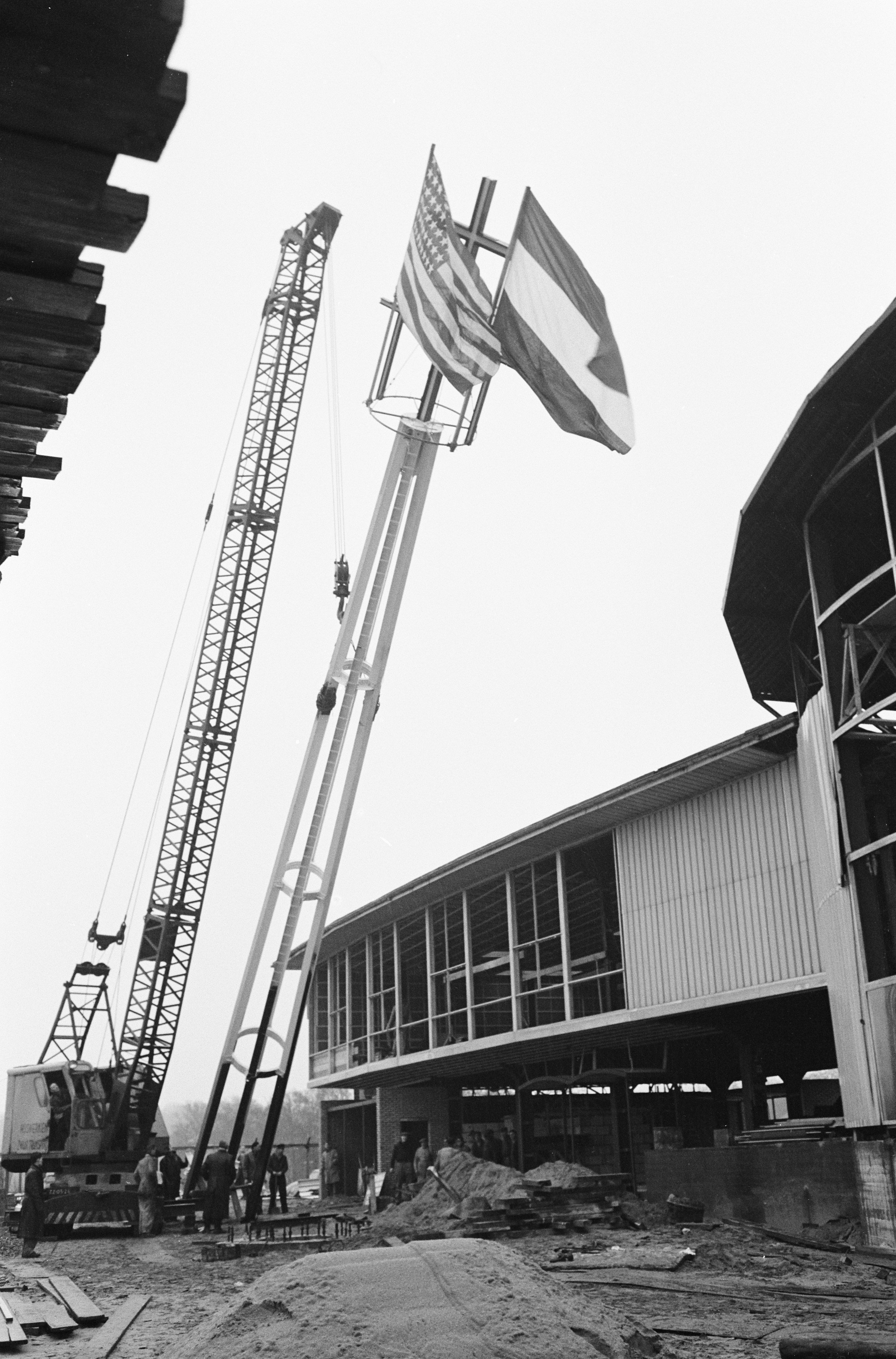
Erection of the tower in The Hague in December 1961.
