= Els Noort =

Dutch far-right activist

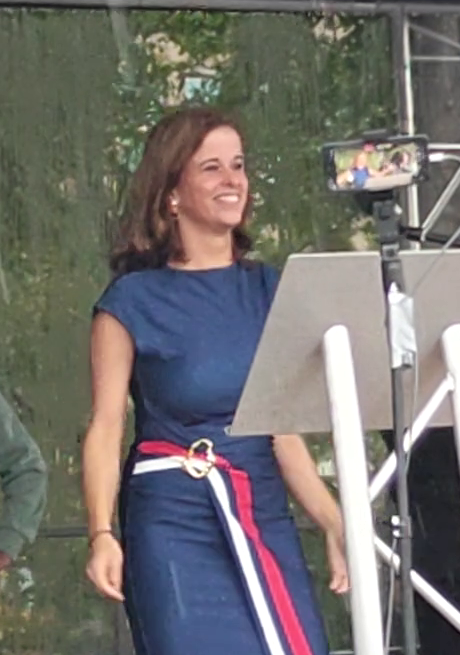
- Els Noort at the demonstration in The Hague
- Born: 1998 or 1999
- Other names: Els Rechts, formerly Els PVV
- Occupation: Political activist
- Known for: Organizing the demonstration at the Malieveld in The Hague, 20 September 2025
- Political party: PVV (sympathizer); FvD (temporary, 2020)

Els Noort (born 1998 or 1999), better known by her online alias Els Rechts (Els Right-wing), is a Dutch far-right activist from Zoetermeer who is active mainly on social media.

Noort organized a demonstration in September 2025 against the Dutch asylum policy at the Malieveld in The Hague. During this protest, Nazi symbols were displayed, and the event ended in violent riots.

== Early life ==
Noort grew up in a Reformed milieu and attended secondary school at the Wartburg College in Rotterdam. At that school, she developed an interest in politics thanks to the director, SGP member Roelof Bisschop.

After secondary school, she completed a vocational education (mbo) course, through which she met PVV leader Geert Wilders. After her studies, she reportedly worked in elderly care.

== Activism and political views ==
Noort was initially active on social media under the username “Els_PVV,” which she changed to “Els_Rechts” in June 2020, before briefly joining Forum for Democracy in July 2020.

On social media, Noort expresses criticism of Dutch immigration policy and support for Wilders’s anti-Islam and anti-asylum positions. In March 2020, she posted on Twitter (later X): "Islam is our biggest enemy! STOP! ISLAM!" Ahead of the 2023 general election, she urged tactical voting for the PVV, writing: “Suppose GroenLinks and the PvdA now beat the BBB, it will really be civil war in the Netherlands. And rightly so. I’ll definitely take part!”

In a July 2025 interview with PowNed, Noort said she wanted to become politically active for the PVV. Since then, she has also been active on Instagram with nearly 8,000 followers. On her website, she describes herself as “an outspoken Christian and right-wing voice defending Dutch values, safety, and traditions.”

== Demonstration at the Malieveld (“Elsfest”) ==
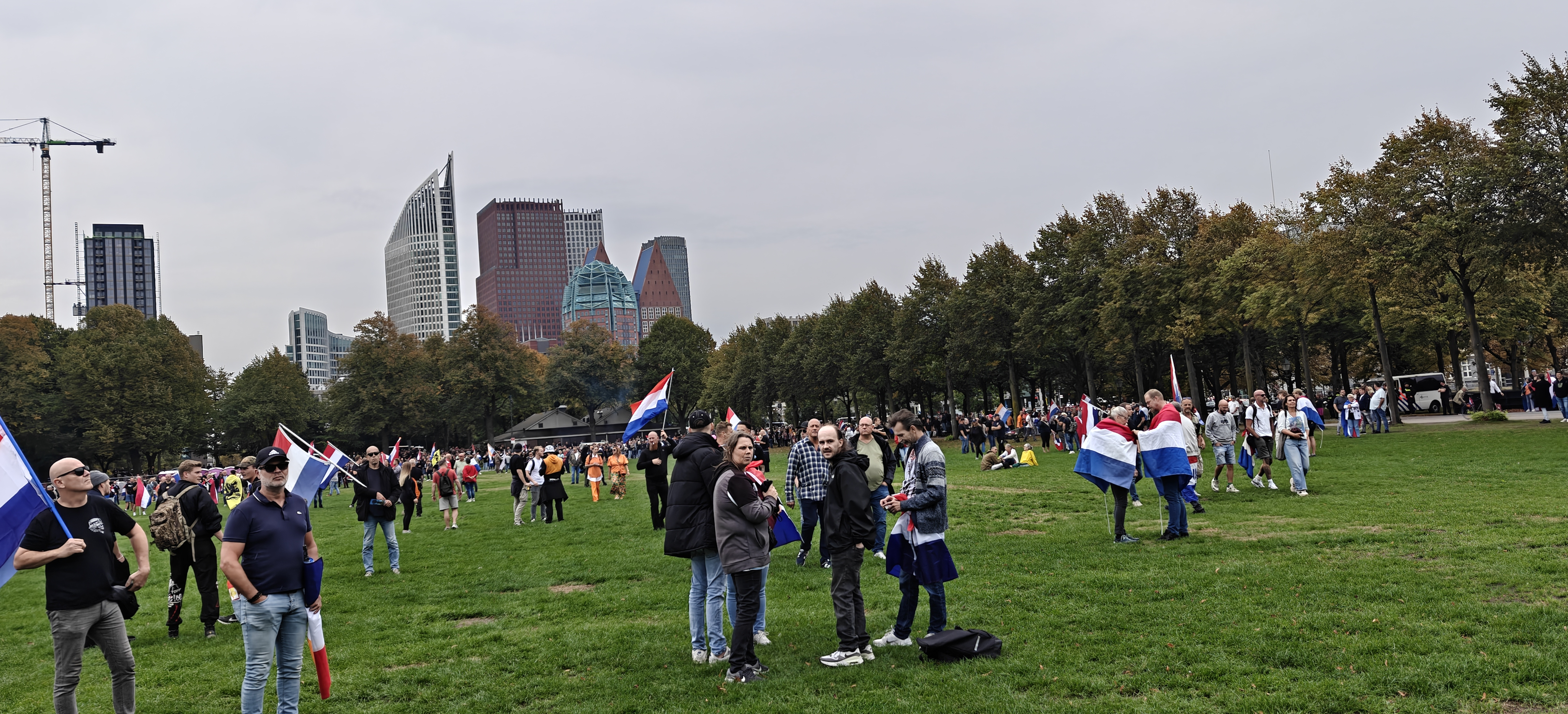
Elsfest

On 20 September 2025, Noort organized a demonstration at the Malieveld, also referred to as Elsfest. The protest was directed against Dutch immigration and asylum policy and against Frans Timmermans as a possible prime minister. Through crowdfunding, she raised €20,415 for the event.

Some participants brought controversial flags such as the Prince's Flag (historically used by the NSB), and some gave the Hitler salute. Unrest broke out during the protest when a group of demonstrators moved toward the A12 highway and temporarily blocked traffic. Police intervened with tear gas and a water cannon. A police vehicle was set on fire, and windows at the nearby D66 party office were smashed. In total, 37 people were arrested; four police officers and several journalists sustained minor injuries.

=== Reaction and aftermath ===
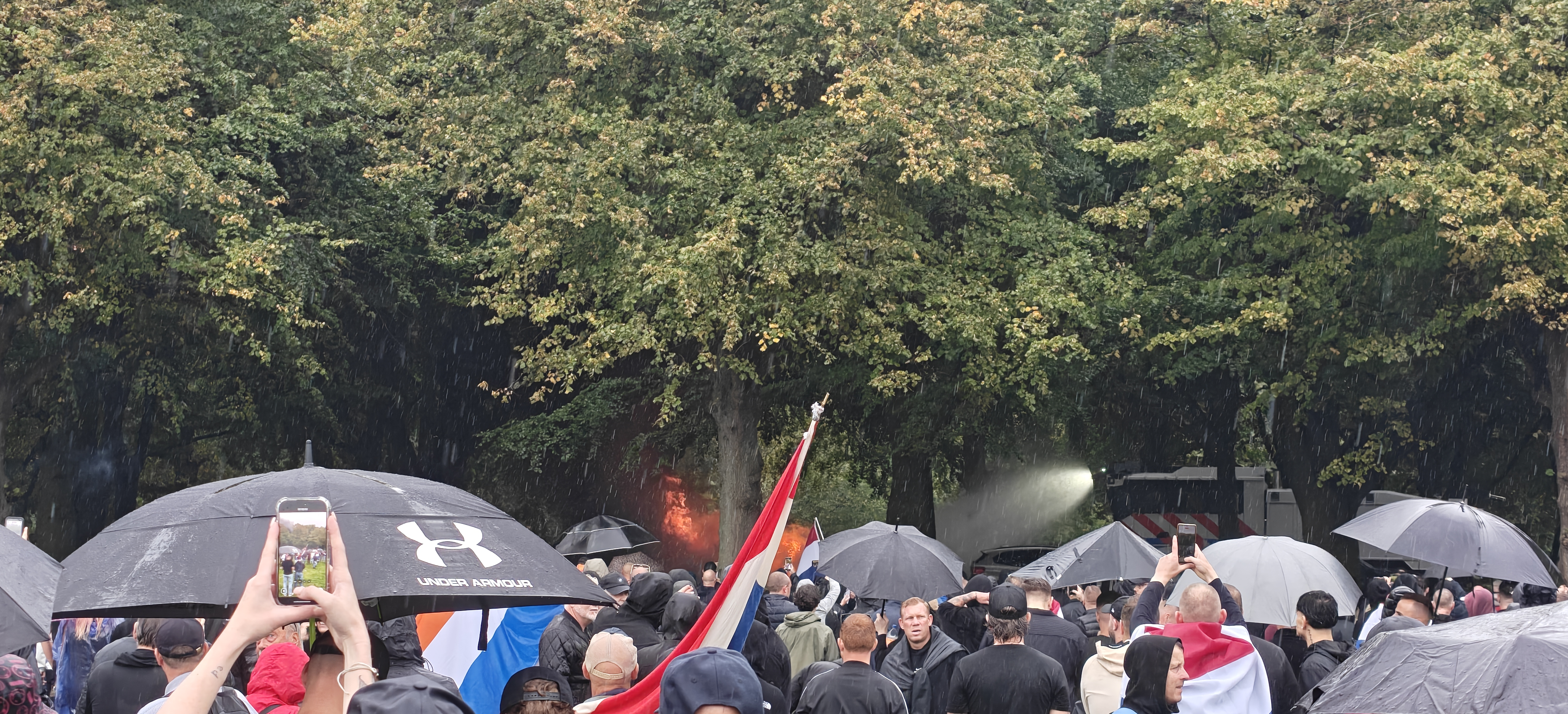
A burning police car being extinguished by a water cannon

The Public Prosecution Service announced that several suspects would be prosecuted for their role in the violence. The House of Representatives debated the events on 25 September 2025. After the protest, Noort said she was shocked that the situation had gotten out of hand, calling herself “perhaps naive” and saying it had never been her intention to incite violence.
