= Malieveld =

Square in The Hague, the Netherlands

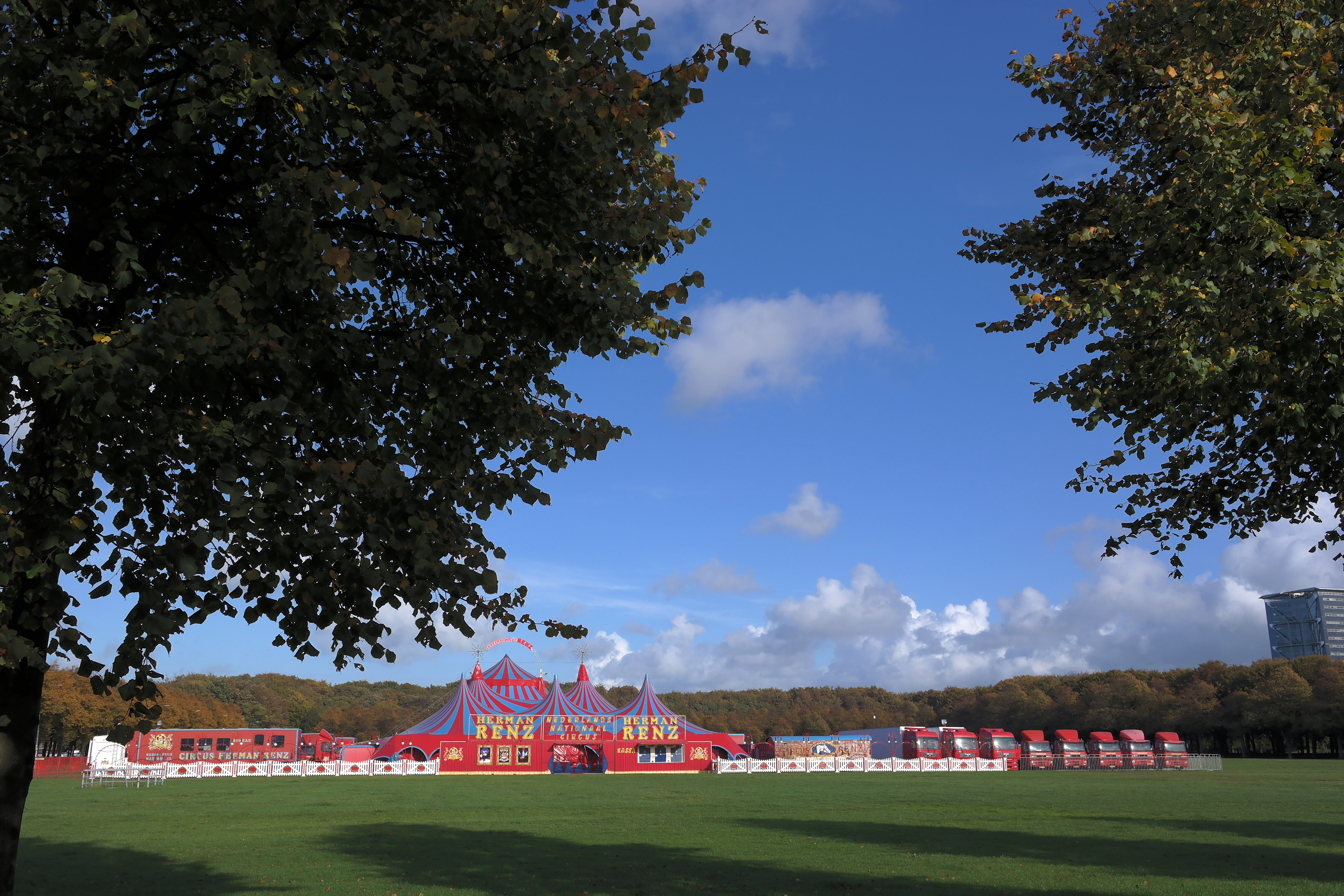
- Circus Herman Renz on Malieveld in October 2014
- Interactive map of Malieveld
- Type: Urban open space
- Location: Haagse Hout, The Hague, Netherlands
- Coordinates: 52.0855°N 4.3198°E
- Area: 13.9 hectares (34 acres)
- Manager: Staatsbosbeheer
- Conservation Area
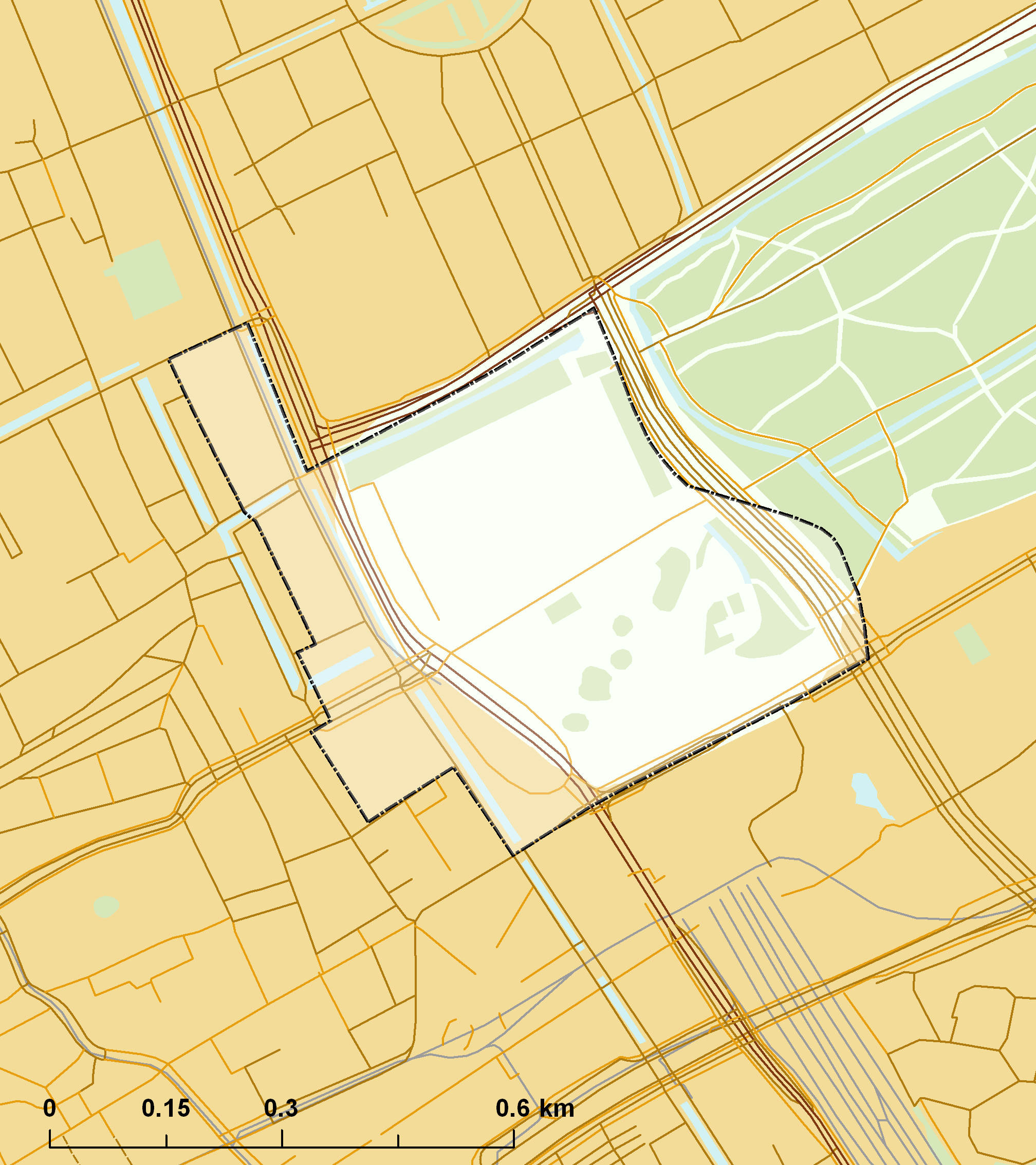
- Name: Malieveld and surroundings
- Designated: 27 November 1972

Malieveld (Dutch pronunciation: [ˈmaːlivɛlt], lit. 'pall-mall field') is a large grass field in the city center of The Hague, Netherlands, located opposite the central train station. The field is widely known in the Netherlands for being the location of many large-scale demonstrations. It is also used for festivals, funfairs, concerts and other big events.

== Concerts ==
On 5 September 1998, The Rolling Stones performed at the Malieveld to celebrate the 750th anniversary of The Hague, which was established in 1248. Despite the rain, it was attended by 86,000 people and became the largest ticketed concert in the history of the Netherlands.

Other massive concerts at the Malieveld include Bruce Springsteen in 2016 (67,500 people), Muse in 2023 (67,000 people) and Coldplay in 2012 (65,000 people). Dutch artists have also performed at the Malieveld to large crowds. In 2022, Anouk married her husband Dominique Schemmekes at the Malieveld during her concert there, attended by over 40,000 people.

Parkpop, a free festival that used be held annually in the Hague, was held at the Malieveld in 2022. From 1981 to 2019, it was held at the Zuiderpark.

== Protests ==
The Malieveld has also been the site of the largest protests in Dutch history. On 29 October 1983, there was a protest against the placement of nuclear missiles by NATO on Dutch soil that drew 550,000 people, which became the largest demonstration in the country's history.

On 18 May 2025, over 100,000 people participated in the first Red Line protest against the Dutch government's relationship with Israel during the Gaza war. The march began at the Malieveld and passed the International Court of Justice, where the court was hearing South Africa's genocide case against Israel. A second Red Line protest on 15 June 2025 was attended by over 150,000 people.

== Gallery ==
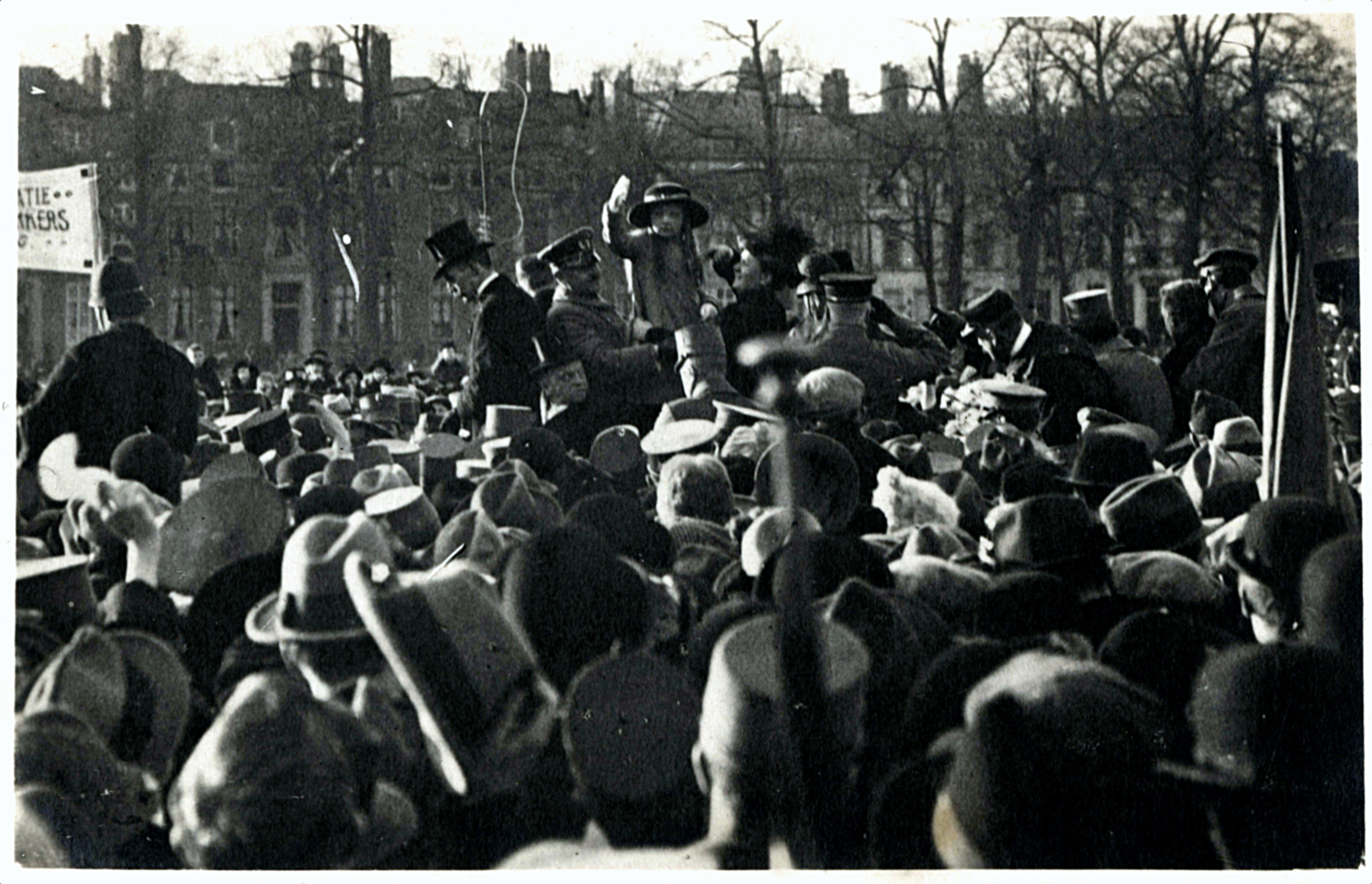
Royalist rally in 1918

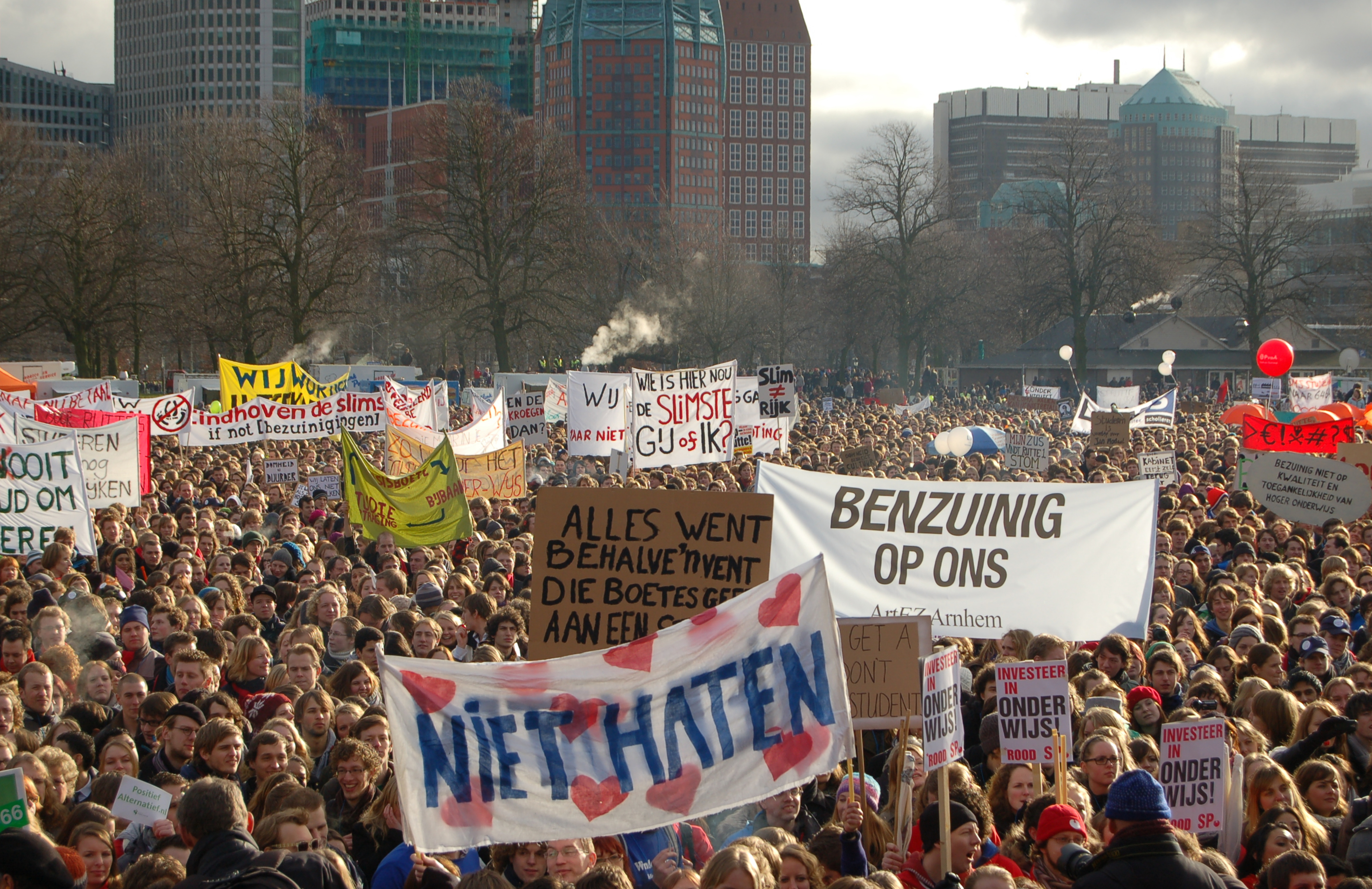
Student protest in 2011

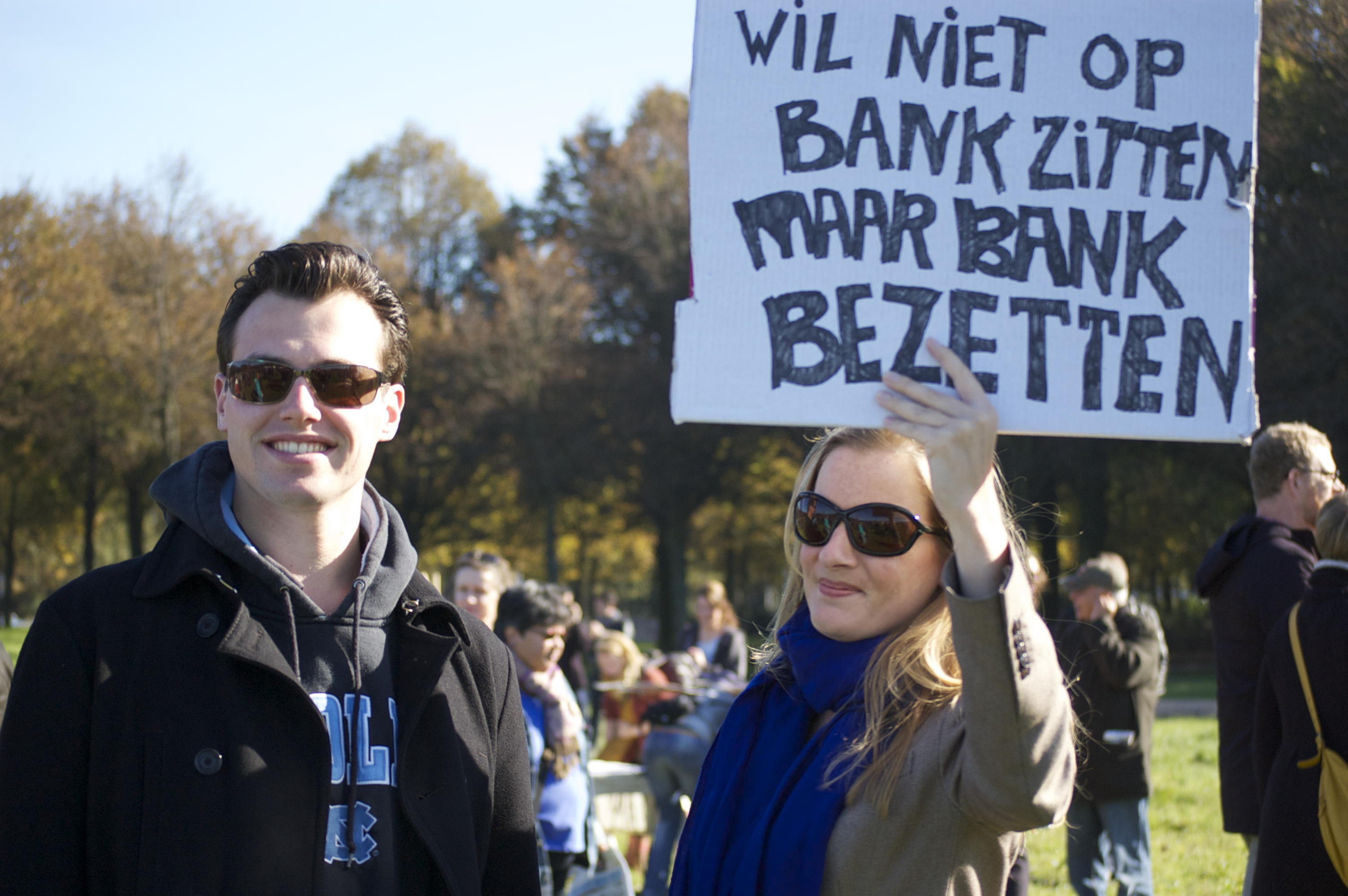
Occupy protest in 2011

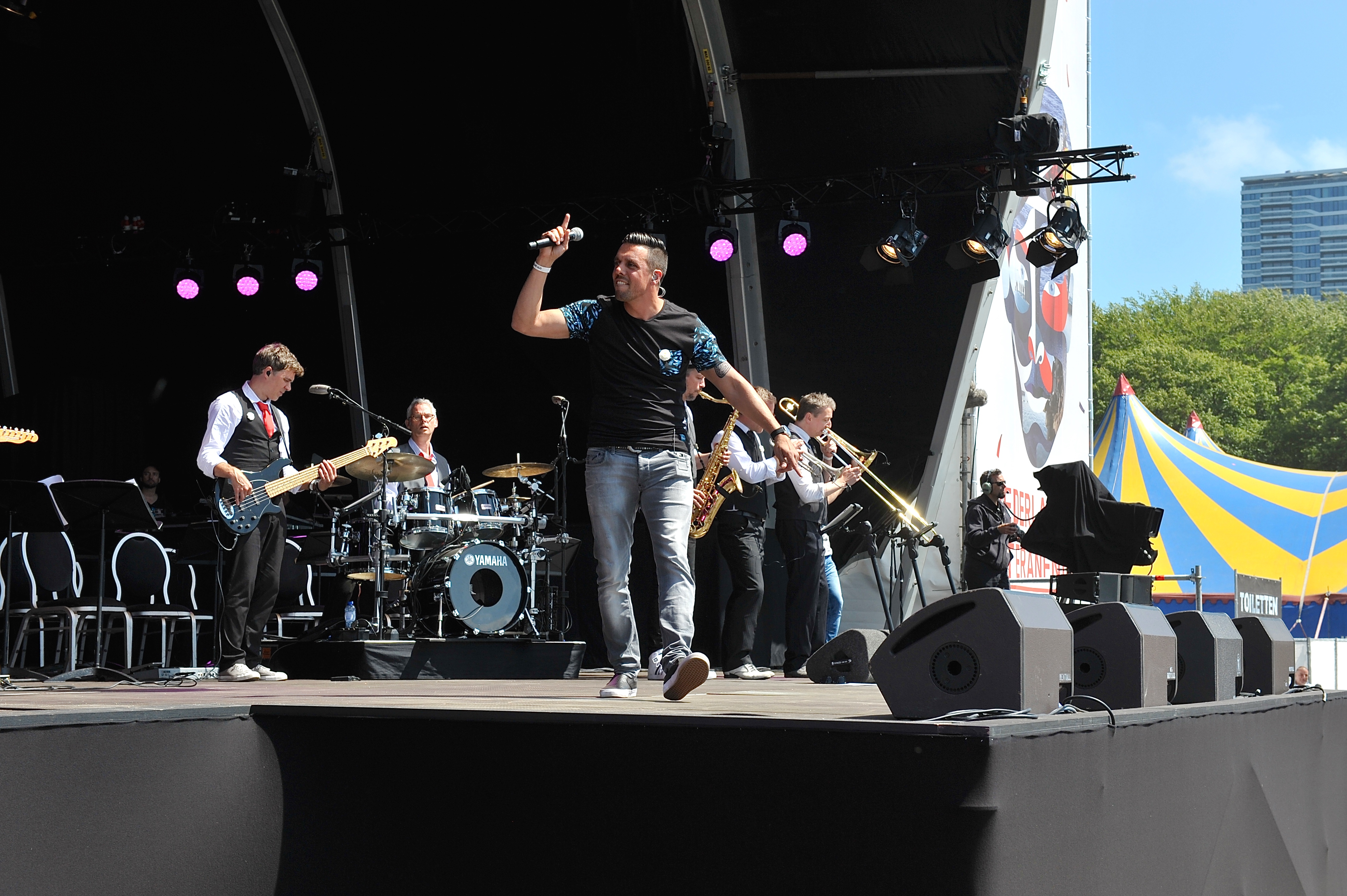
Veterans' Day in 2015

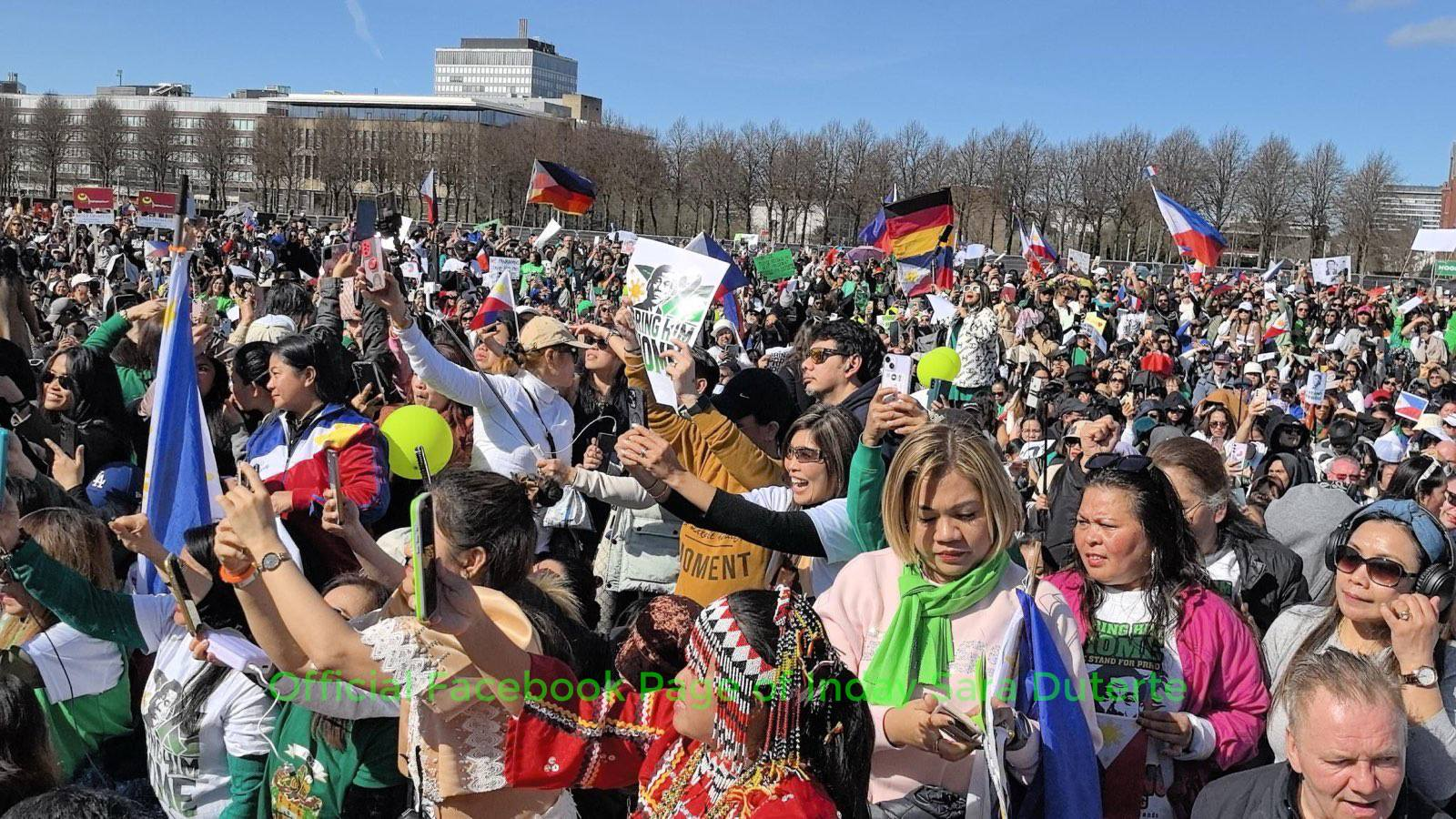
Protest against the arrest of Rodrigo Duterte in 2025

== See also ==
- Haagse Bos
- Museumplein
- Champ de Mars
