= Haagse Hout =

City district of The Hague, Netherlands

Coordinates: 52.0944°N 4.3548°E

- District of The Hague
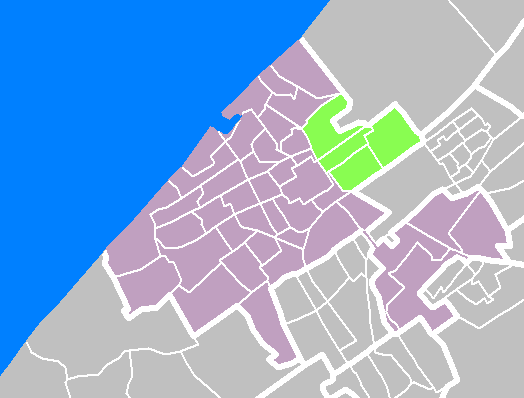
- Location of Haagse Hout in The Hague
- Country: Netherlands
- Province: South Holland

Area
  - Total: 904.1 ha (2,234 acres)
  - Land: 868.2 ha (2,145 acres)

Population (2025)
  - Total: 50,867

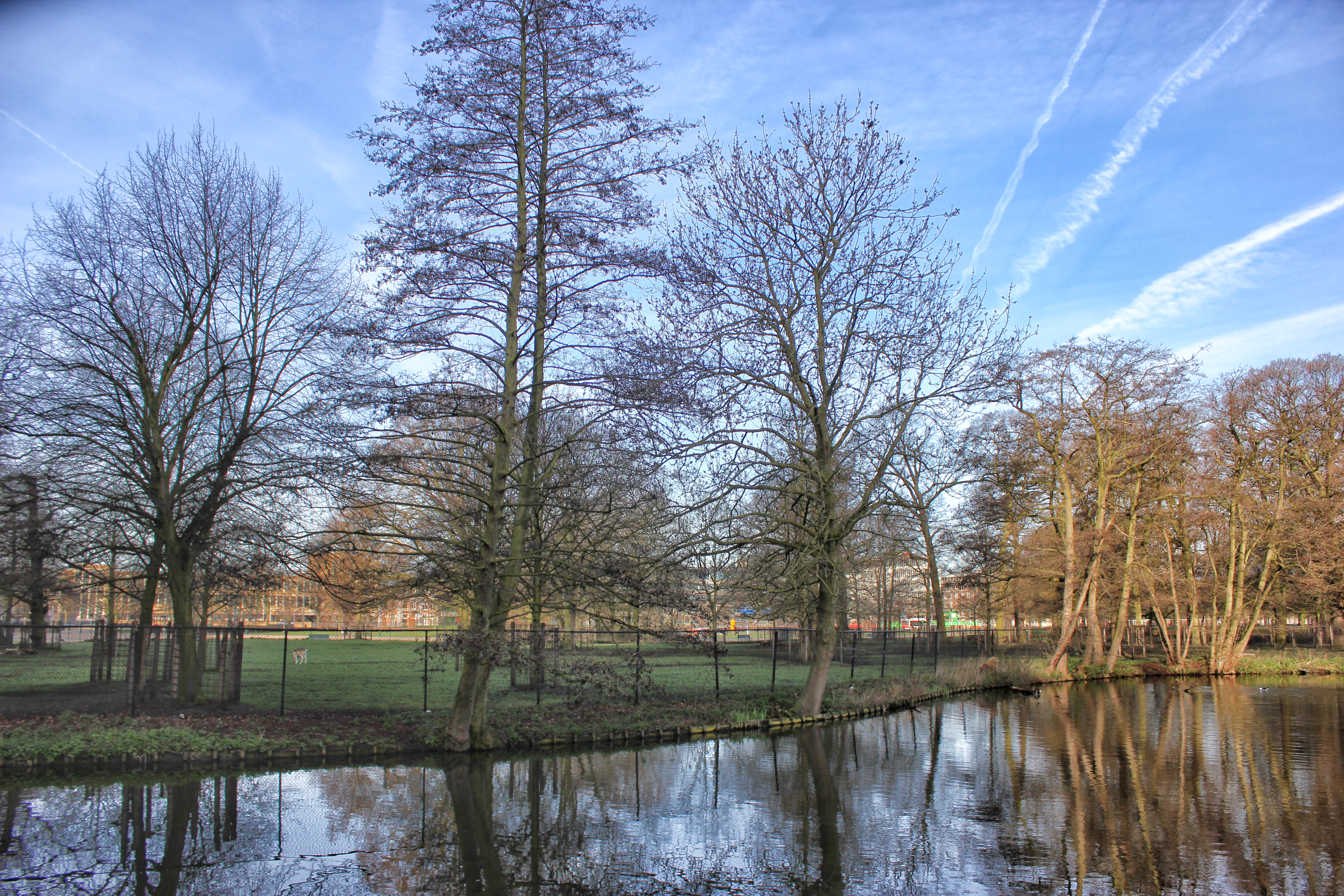
Landscape of Haagse Hout.

Haagse Hout (Dutch pronunciation: [ˌɦaːxsə ˈɦʌut]; lit. 'Woods of The Hague') is one of the eight districts of The Hague. This area was originally called Die Haghe Houte, which later became the current Haagse Hout. The district has 50,693 residents as of 1 January 2026. It is located in the north-east of the city, bordering Wassenaar to the north and Leidschendam-Voorburg to the east.

== Neighbourhoods ==
Haagse Hout is divided into four neighbourhoods:

- Benoordenhout
- Bezuidenhout
- Mariahoeve en Marlot
- Haagse Bos

Bezuidenhout is usually divided further into Bezuidenhout East and Bezuidenhout West. Mariahoeve and Marlot are also sometimes separately named. Villapark Marlot has the highest income of The Hague, and is one of the greener areas. The Haagse Bos is the largest green area, almost completely covered by parks and fields. This city park divides Haagse Hout into two: Benoordenhout and Bezuidenhout (lit. 'North of the Woods' and 'South of the Woods').
