= Haagse Bos =

Coordinates: 52°05′25″N 4°20′0″E

- Location of Haagse Bos in The Hague
- Country: Netherlands
- Province: South Holland
- Municipality: The Hague
- District: Haagse Hout

Area
  - Total: 1.28 km^{2} (0.49 sq mi)
  - Land: 1.17 km^{2} (0.45 sq mi)
  - Water: 0.11 km^{2} (0.04 sq mi)

Population (1 January 2025)
  - Total: 499
  - Density: 390/km^{2} (1,000/sq mi)

Haagse Bos (Dutch pronunciation: [ˌɦaːxsə ˈbɔs]; lit. 'Forest of The Hague') is a rectangular neighbourhood and forest in the Haagse Hout district of The Hague, Netherlands, reaching from the old city centre in the south-west to the border of Wassenaar in the north-east. It is also one of the oldest remaining forests of the country. During World War II, the park was used by the Germans for launching V-1 and V-2 rockets.

== History ==
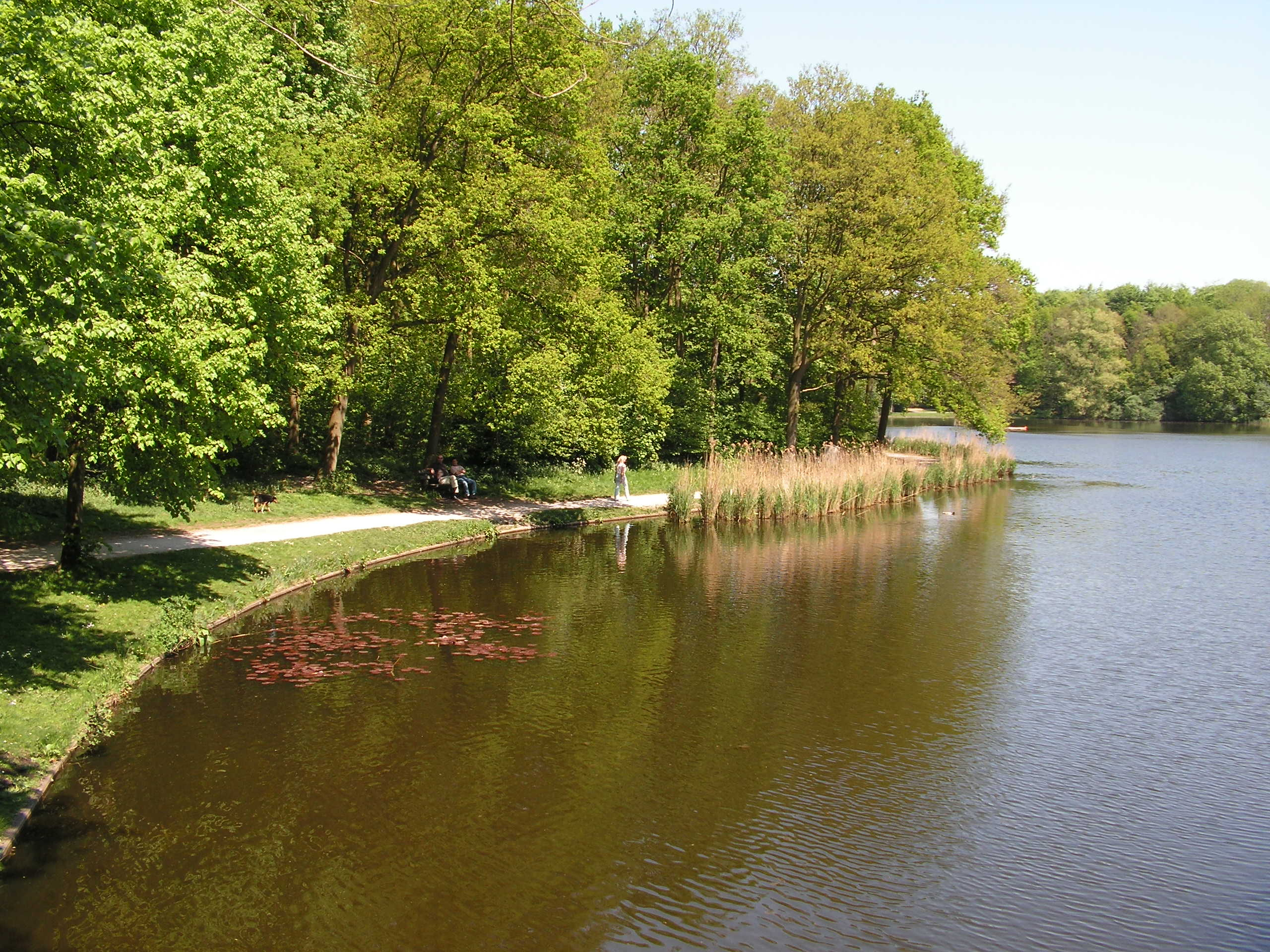
A view of Haagse Bos

Originally, the Haagse Bos was a section of a bigger forest that stretched from 's-Gravenzande to Alkmaar. This was simply called Die Hout (The Woods). The title eventually gave way to the name Houtland (which literally means "woods lands") and later became Holland. From this original forest only the Haagse Bos remains. During the reign of William II and Floris V, the forest was considerably reduced to make space and provide wood for the growing nearby fortress, the Binnenhof, and the surrounding village of The Hague. However, even in the Middle Ages there were strict rules in place to protect the Haagse Bos from becoming completely cut down, since the forest was a popular hunting area of the Dutch counts.

During the beginning of the Eighty Years' War, the Haagse Bos was once again quickly shrunk to make way for more residents of The Hague. In 1571, a sixth of the oak forests were cut to build defences against the Spanish army. The so-called "Act of Redemption", signed on 1576 by William the Silent declared that no further cutting or sale of the forest would be permitted. This law still stands today. During the French Occupation in the early 19th century, the forest was about to be cut down, but due to saboteurs and work delays the plan was never implemented. After the French occupation the ponds in the forest were made.

In the Second World War the forest was used by the German Army as a launching place for their V-1 and V-2 rockets. An attempt by the Allies to destroy this facility led to the accidental bombardment on the adjacent Bezuidenhout district. Since 1899 the National Forest Administration of the Netherlands (the Staatsbosbeheer) has owned and administered the park. Despite its protected status, two major motorways cut through the forest: the A12 and the Laan van Nieuw Oost Indië.
