= Old Church Tower at Nuenen =

Painting series by Vincent van Gogh

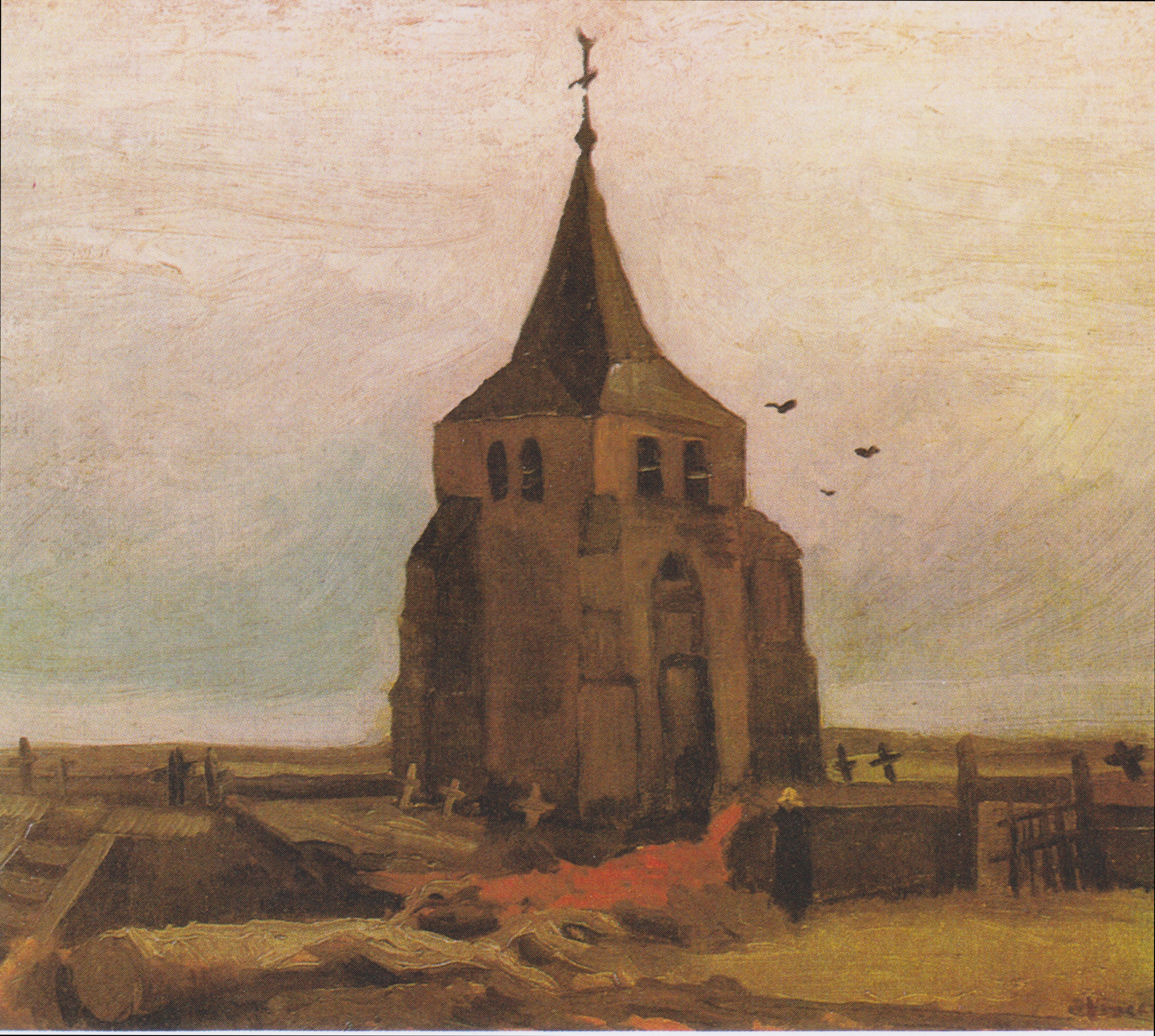
- Old Church Tower at Nuenen, 1884, (F88)
- Artist: Vincent van Gogh
- Year: 1884-1885
- Location: Foundation E.G. Bührle Collection, Zürich

Old Church Tower at Nuenen (or The Peasants' Churchyard) are names given to several oil paintings and drawings created in 1884 and 1885 by Vincent van Gogh. Most reflect the way the 12th-century church looked in its better days when its spire was intact and its foundation formidable. The spire was demolished in 1792 and the church tower was in the process of being torn down and sold for scrap as Van Gogh made the paintings.

== Background ==
In 1882, Van Gogh's father became pastor in Nuenen and the family lived at the vicarage at Nuenen, a small village in the North Brabant district of the Netherlands. After a stay in Drenthe for several months, Van Gogh moved to live with his parents in December 1883 and stayed there until May 1885. While in Nuenen Van Gogh worked on character studies of the local peasants. It was winter and there was little to be done in the fields, so Van Gogh was able to make connections to people through his father, a town minister. Van Gogh's character studies culminated in his best known painting The Potato Eaters. Potatoes were a staple of the poor peasant's diet, who could barely afford bread and meat was a luxury. Potato was a food not fit for those who could afford better in the 19th century. Thomas Carlyle, a Scottish philosopher, deemed the poor "root-eaters".

While in Nuenen, Van Gogh made a number of paintings of The Old Church Tower at Nuenen, born of his enjoyment of visiting churches and cemeteries. Vincent was the second child to his parents, born exactly one year after their first baby, still born, also named Vincent. Like other "substitute" children, he regularly visited the site of his sibling's grave. Vincent's brother was buried in Zundert Groot, but his death may have been an influencing factor in his interest in churches and graveyards.

He also may have been inspired by Jean-François Millet's The Church at Greville.

== History ==
The Old Church Tower is the final remains of a 12th-century Romanesque church built during Christianity's spread across the countryside. It is surrounded by an old burial ground whose graves were marked with simple wooden crosses. The spire was demolished before Van Gogh's early watercolors of the tower could be developed into oil paintings. At the time, the building itself was crumbling. The final version of the oil paintings were finished just before the building was demolished and the remains sold for scrap.

== The paintings ==
Van Gogh made eleven drawings and paintings of the Church tower; one of the drawings is of a funeral.

Old Church Tower at Nuenen, ('The Peasants' Churchyard') (F84) was made as a tribute to the simple, humble lives of the peasants who "for centuries... have been laid to rest, among the fields in which they rooted when alive." The ruined tower he saw a symbol of the declining role of Christianity in people's lives. The tower was demolished shortly after van Gogh concluded this painting.

Van Gogh wrote of this painting:

"I wanted to express how perfectly simple death & burial is, as simple as the falling of autumn leaves -- just some earth dug up -- a little wooden cross. The fields around -- they make a final line against the horizon, where the grass of the churchyard ends -- like a horizon of sea. An now this ruin tells me how a creed and religion have moldered away, even though they were so well established -- how, nevertheless, the life & death of the peasants is and remains the same: always sprouting and withering like the grass and the flowers that are growing in this graveyard."

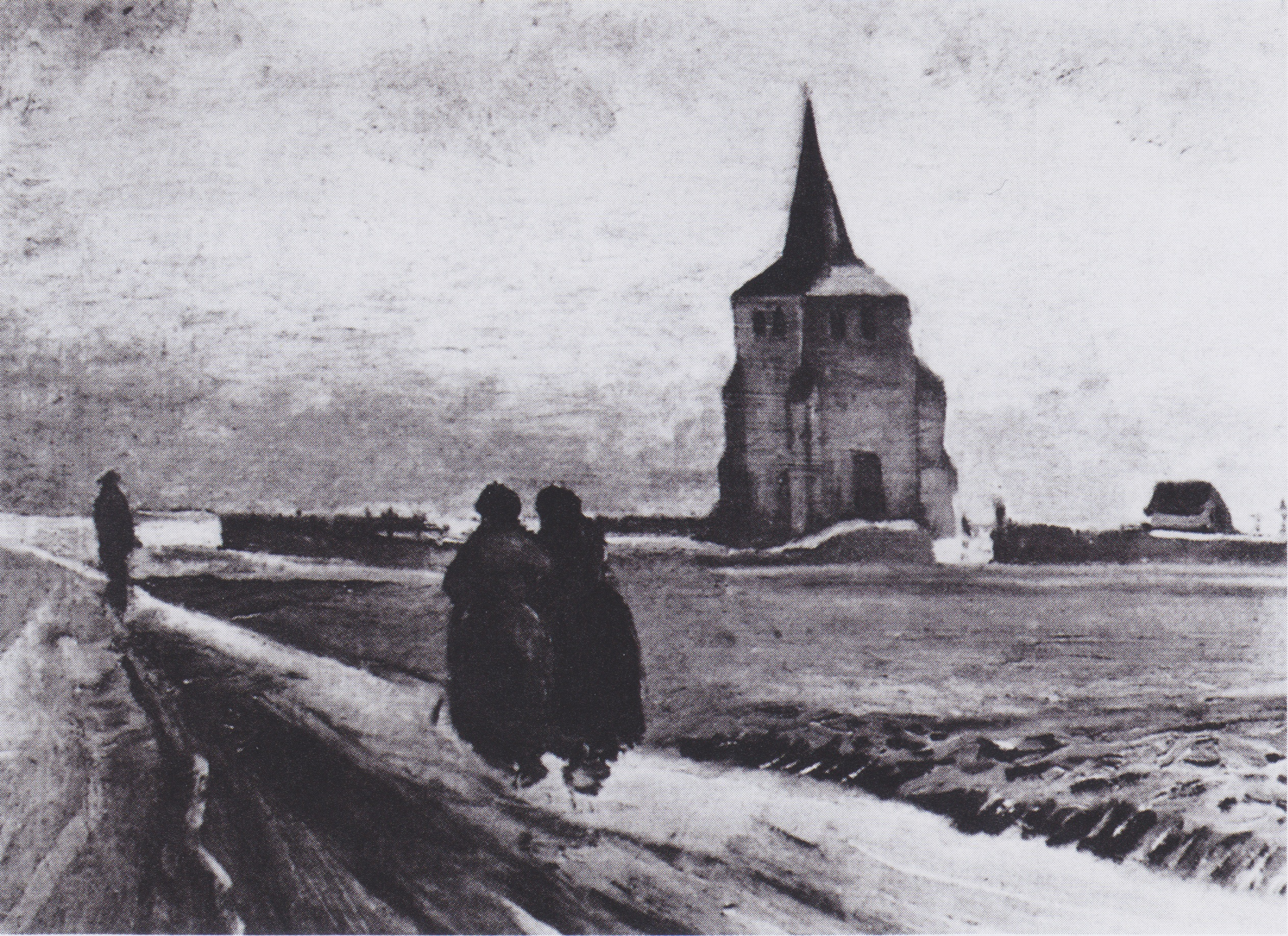
The Old Tower of Nuenen with People Walking, 1884, Private collection (F184)

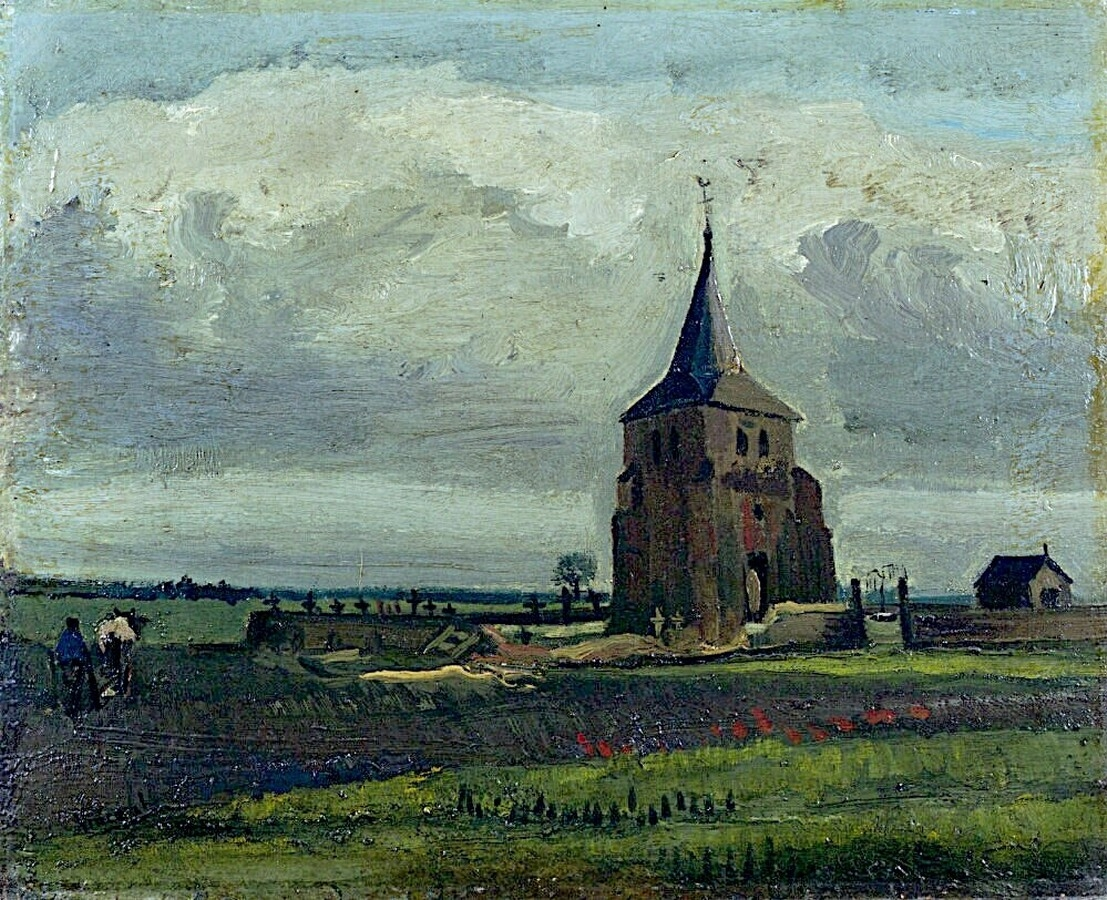
The Old Tower at Nuenen with a Ploughman, 1884, Kröller-Müller Museum, Otterlo, Netherlands (F34)

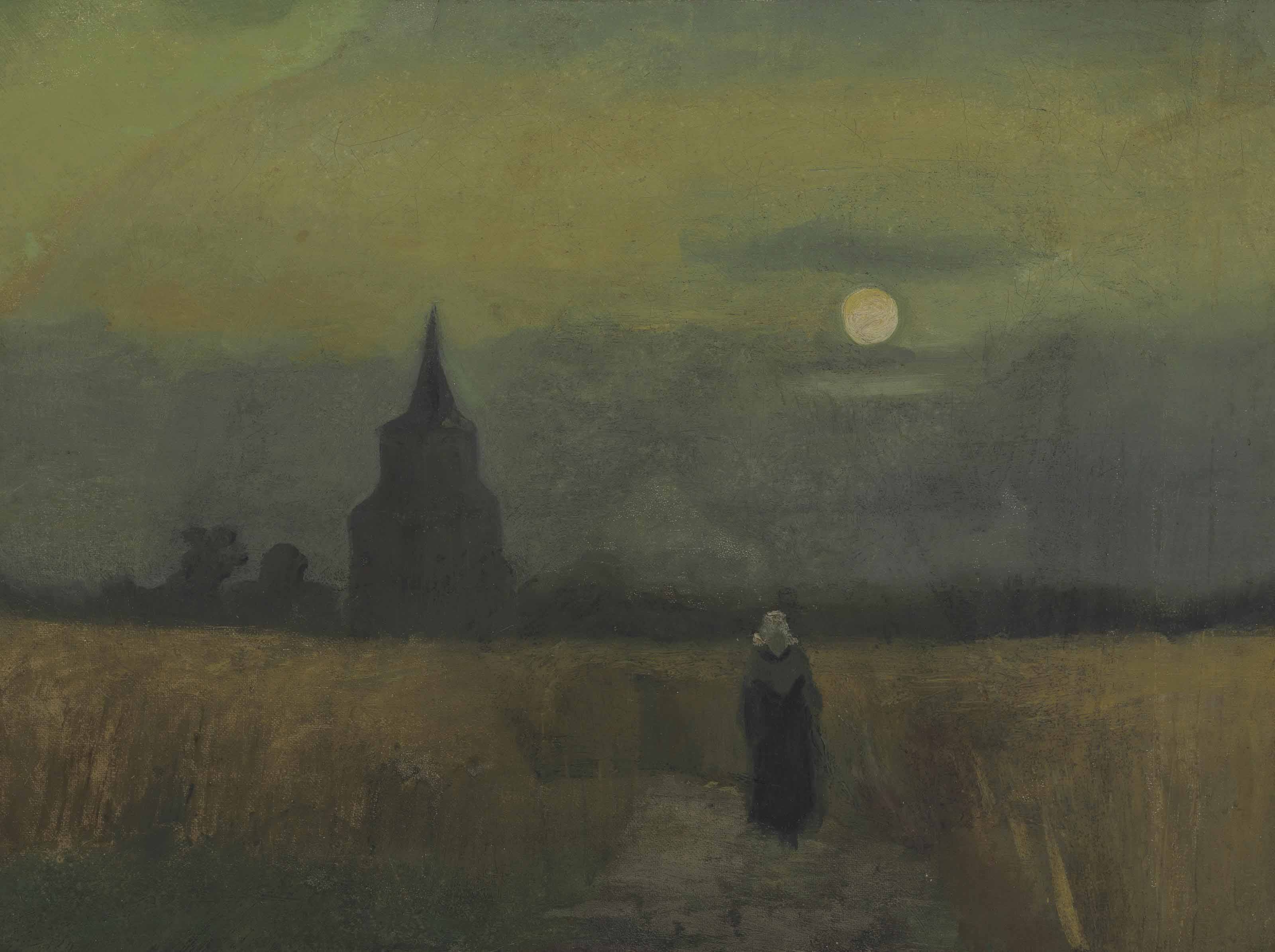
The Old Tower at Dusk, 1884, private collection, (F40)

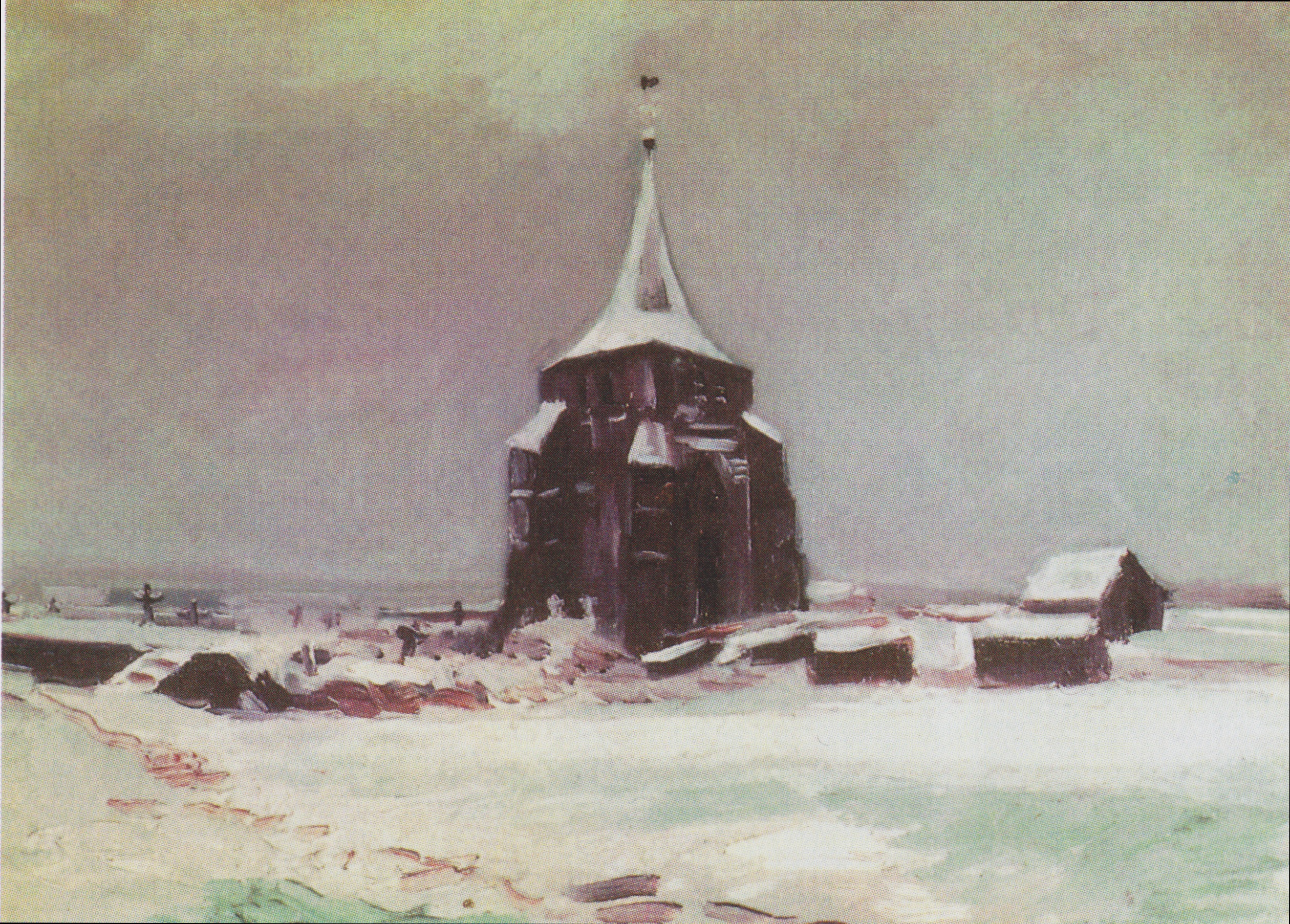
The Old Cemetery Tower at Nuenen in the Snow, 1885, Tate, London (F87)

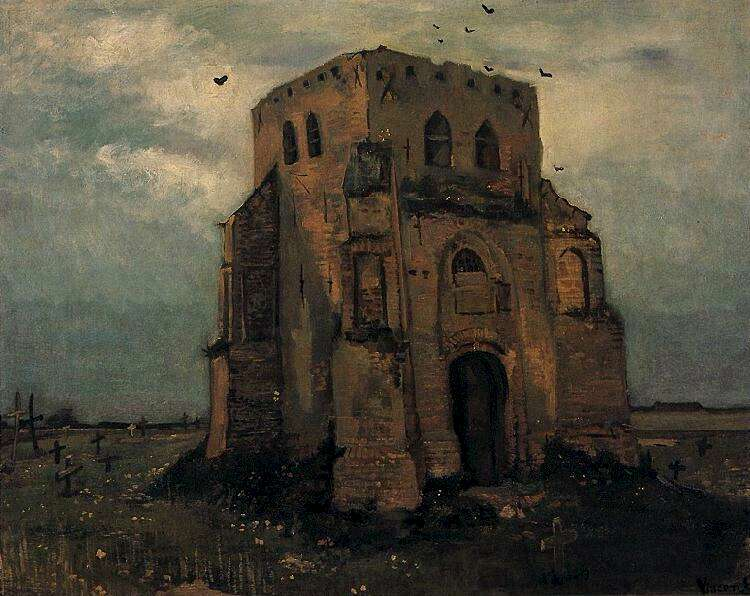
Old Church Tower at Nuenen, ('The Peasants' Churchyard'), 1885, Van Gogh Museum, Amsterdam (F84)

== Other paintings of churches ==
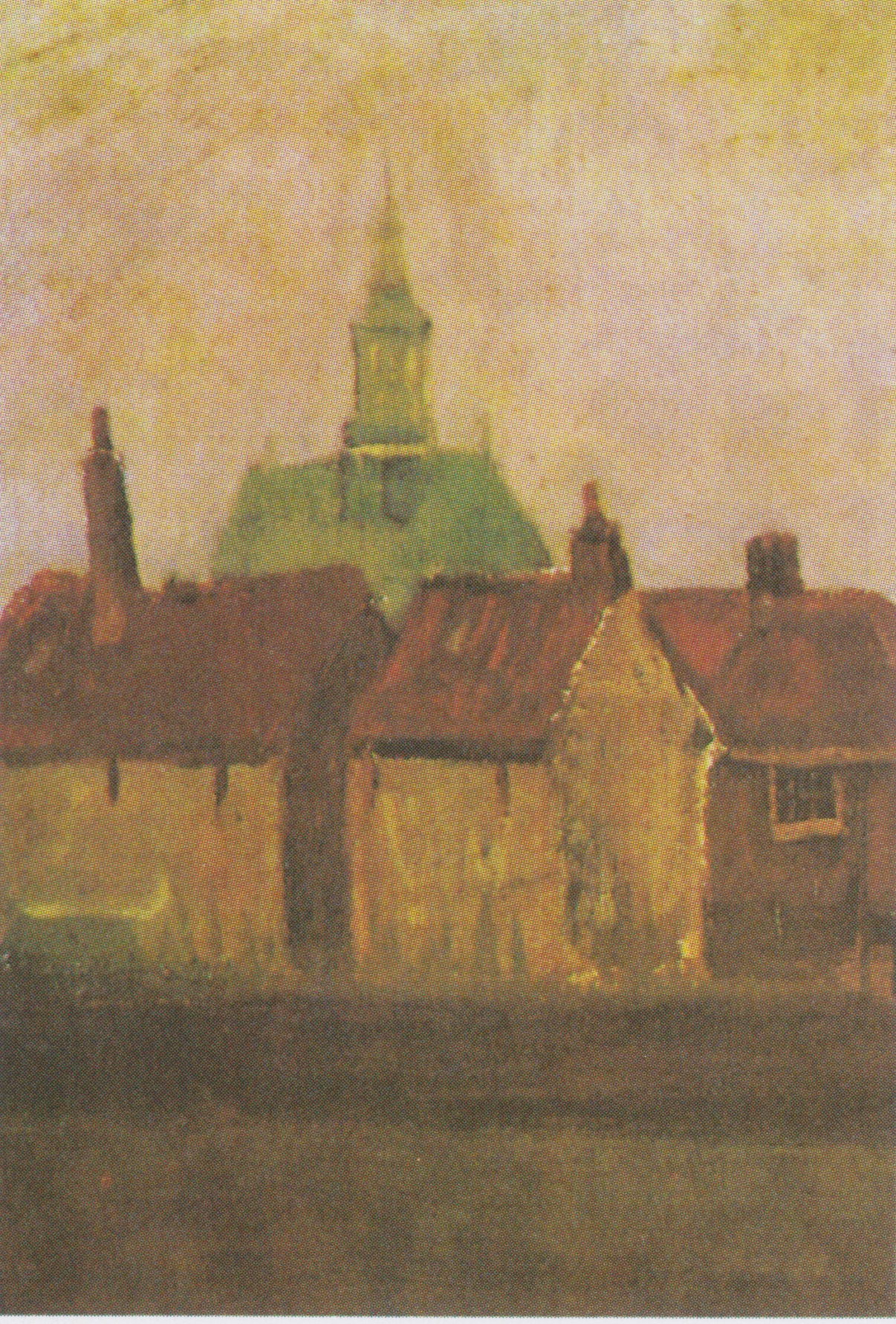
Cluster of Old Houses with the New Church in The Hague, 1882, Private collection (F204)

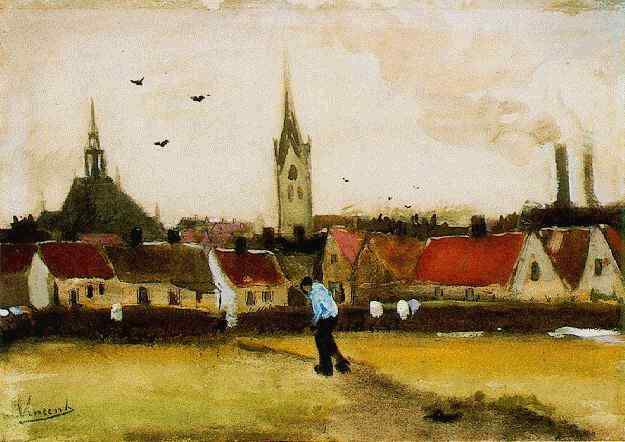
View of The Hague with the New Church, Watercolor, 1882, Collection of Kunsthandel Ivo Bouwman, The Hague (F1680)

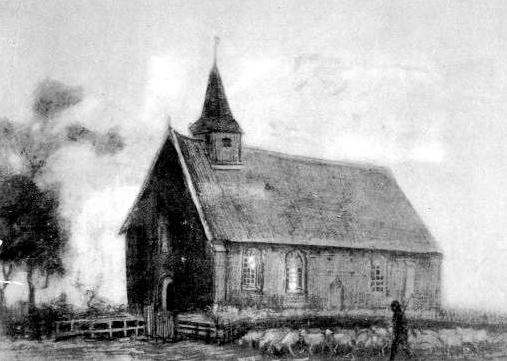
Shepherd with Flock near a Little Church at Zweeloo, Drawing, Pen and pencil, 1883, Private collection (F877)

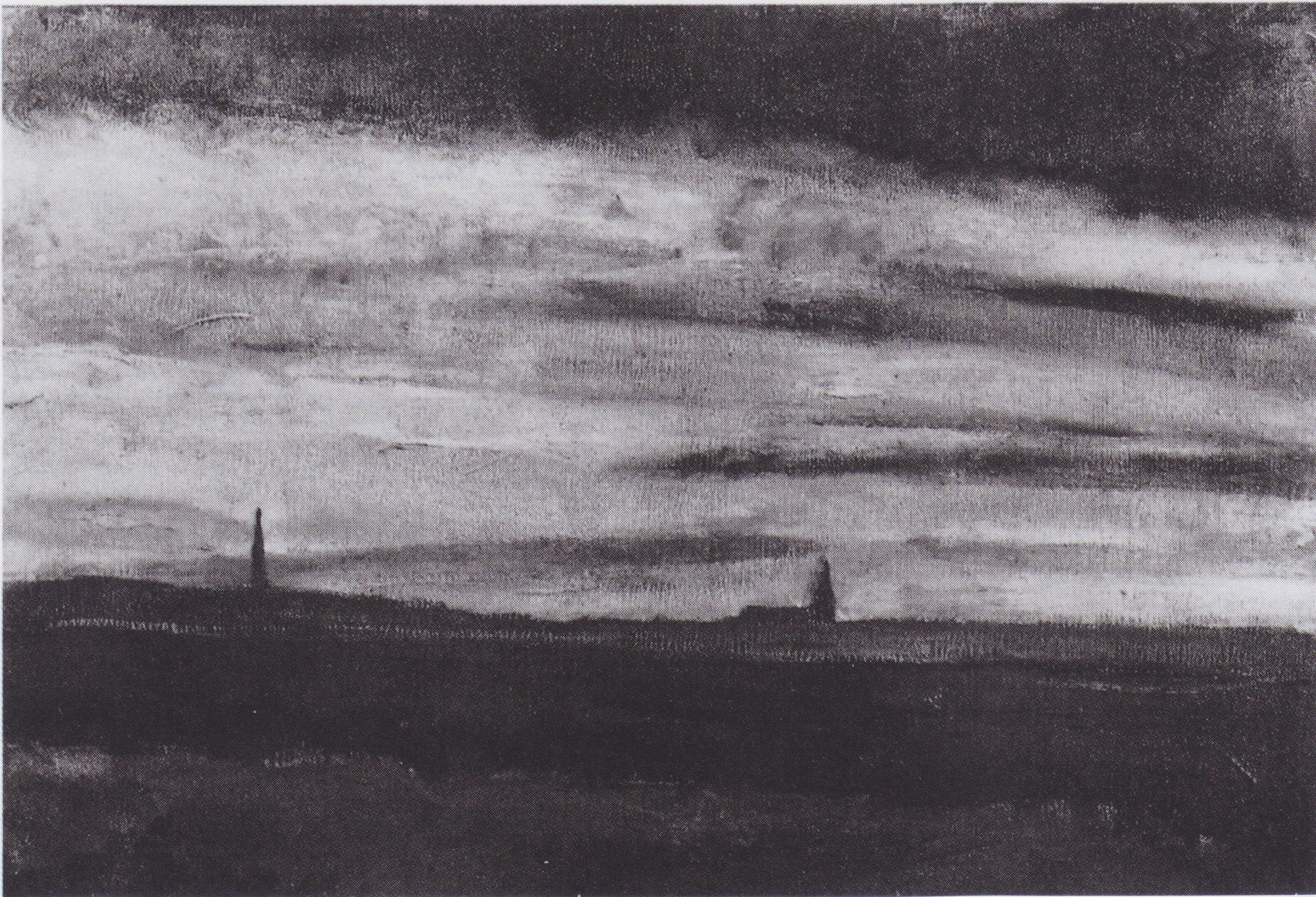
Landscape with a Church at Twilight, 1883, Private collection (F188)

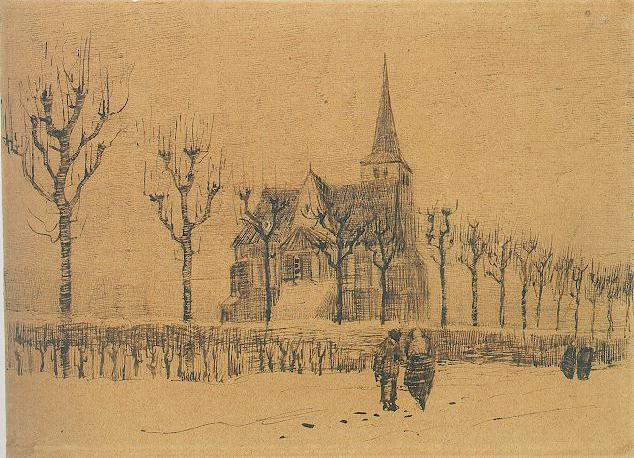
Landscape with a Church, Drawing with pencil and pen, 1883, Van Gogh Museum, Amsterdam (F1238)

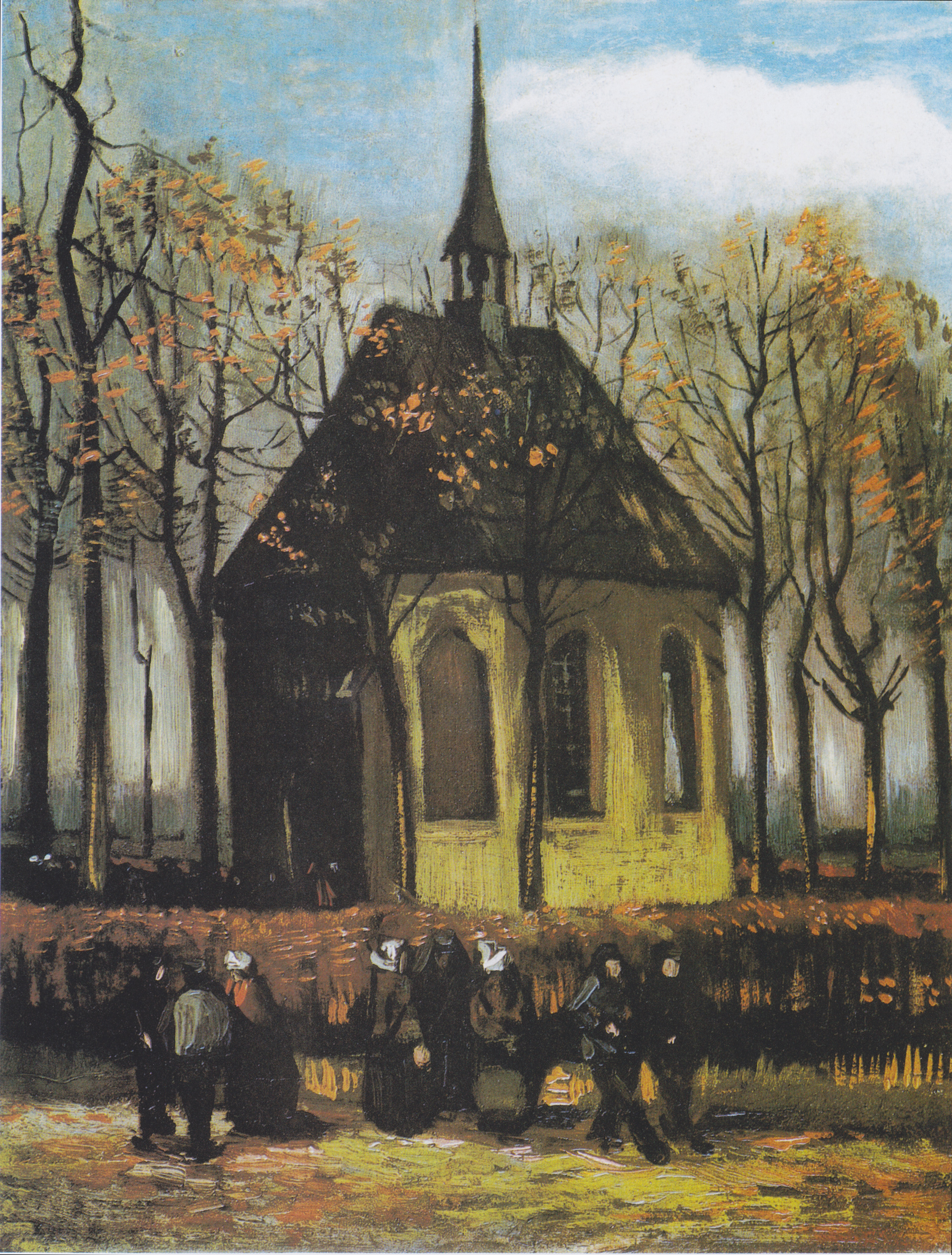
Congregation Leaving the Reformed Church in Nuenen, 1884, Van Gogh Museum, Amsterdam (F25)

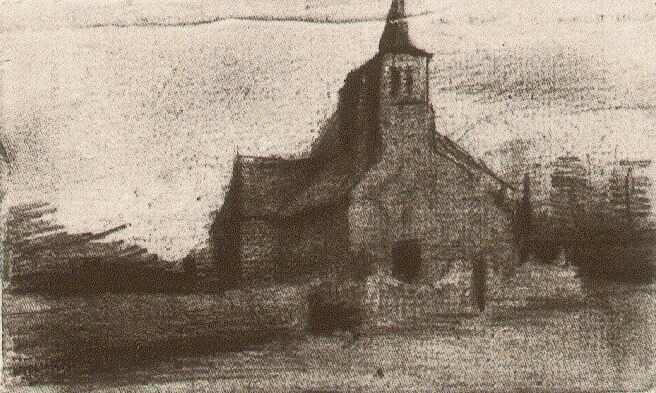
St. Martin's Church at Tongelre, Drawing in pencil and chalk, 1885, Van Gogh Museum, Amsterdam (F: None, JH: 640)

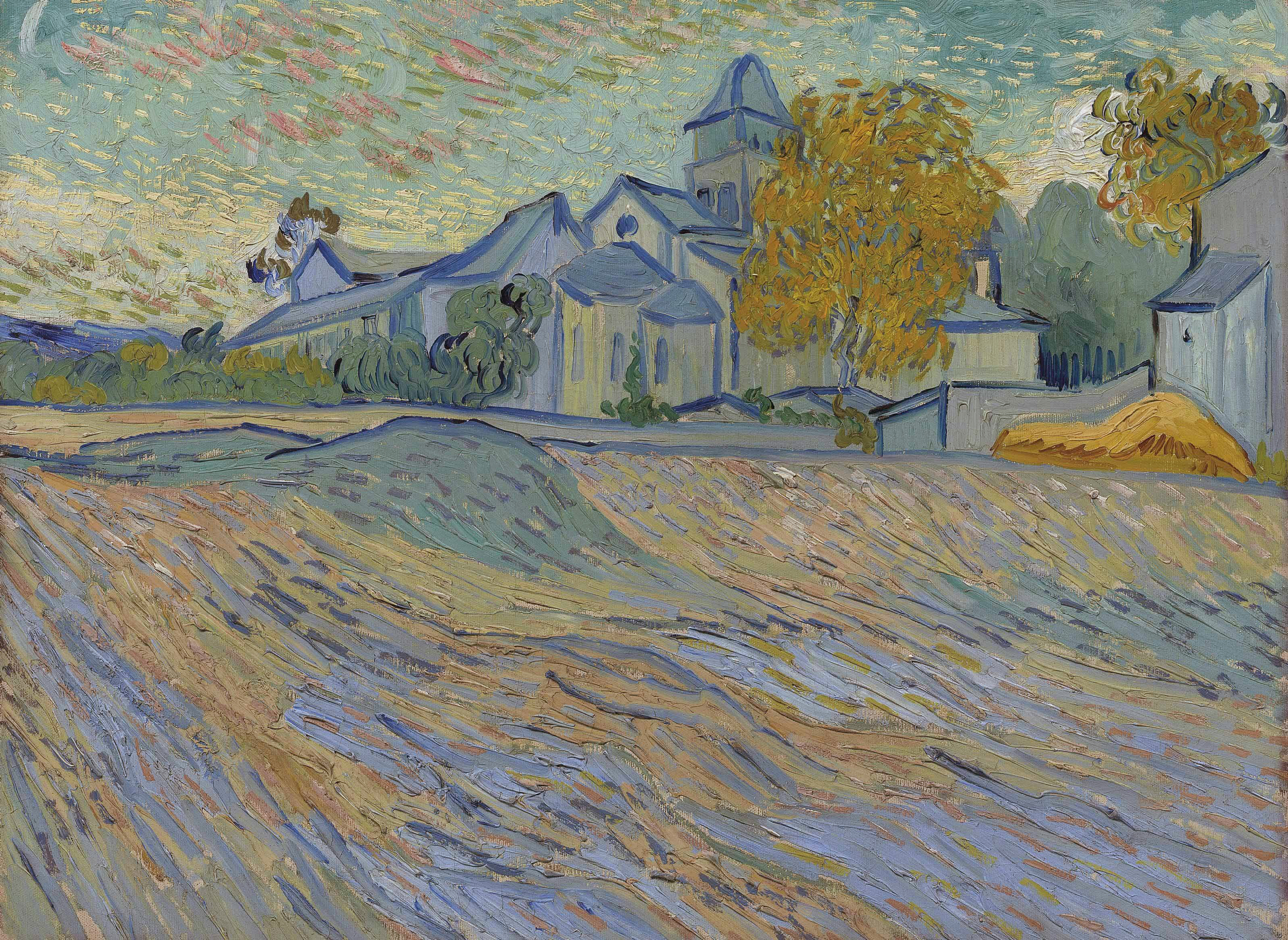
View of the church of Saint-Paul-de-Mausole, 1889, Private collection (F803)

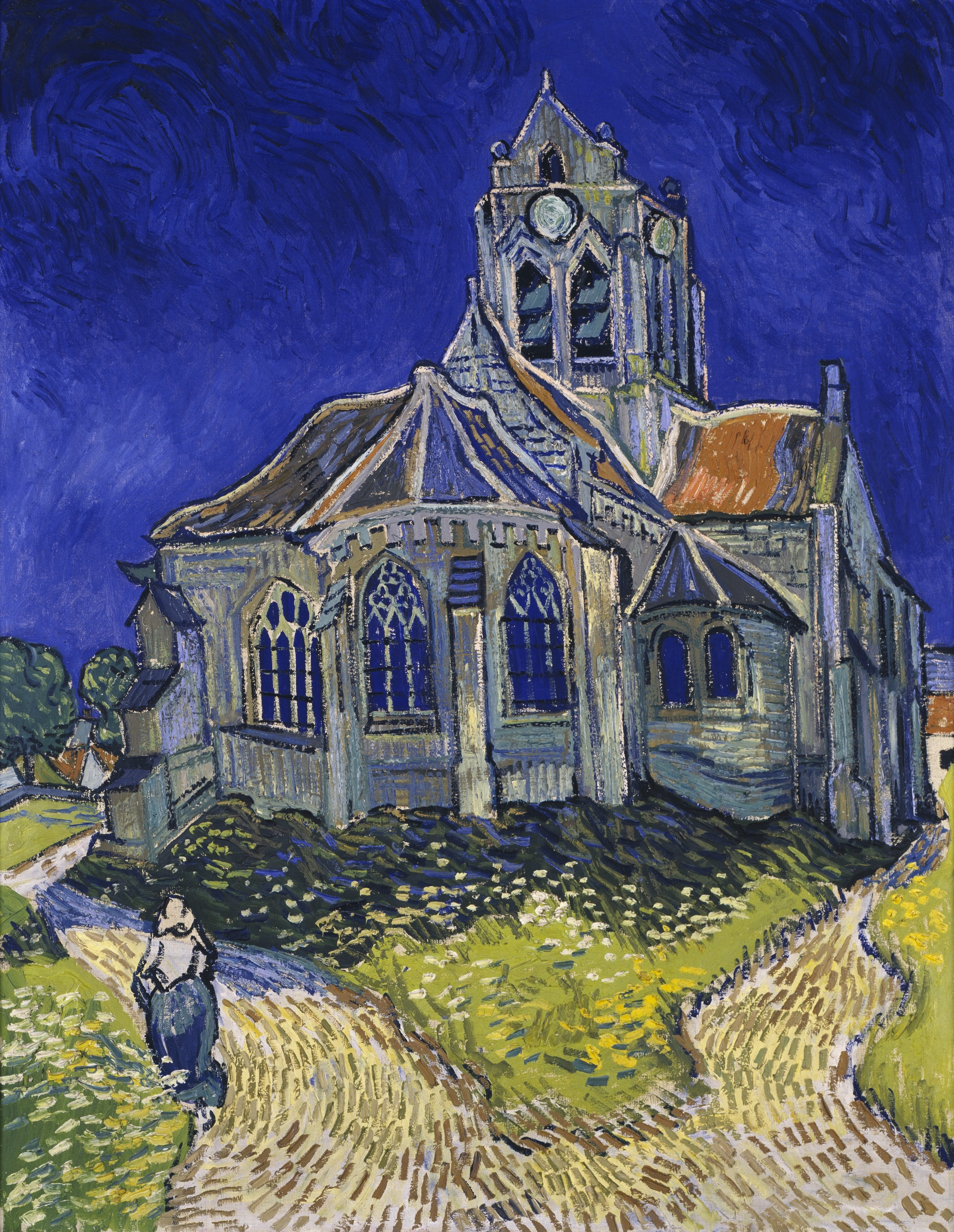
The Church at Auvers, 1890, Musée d'Orsay, Paris (F789)

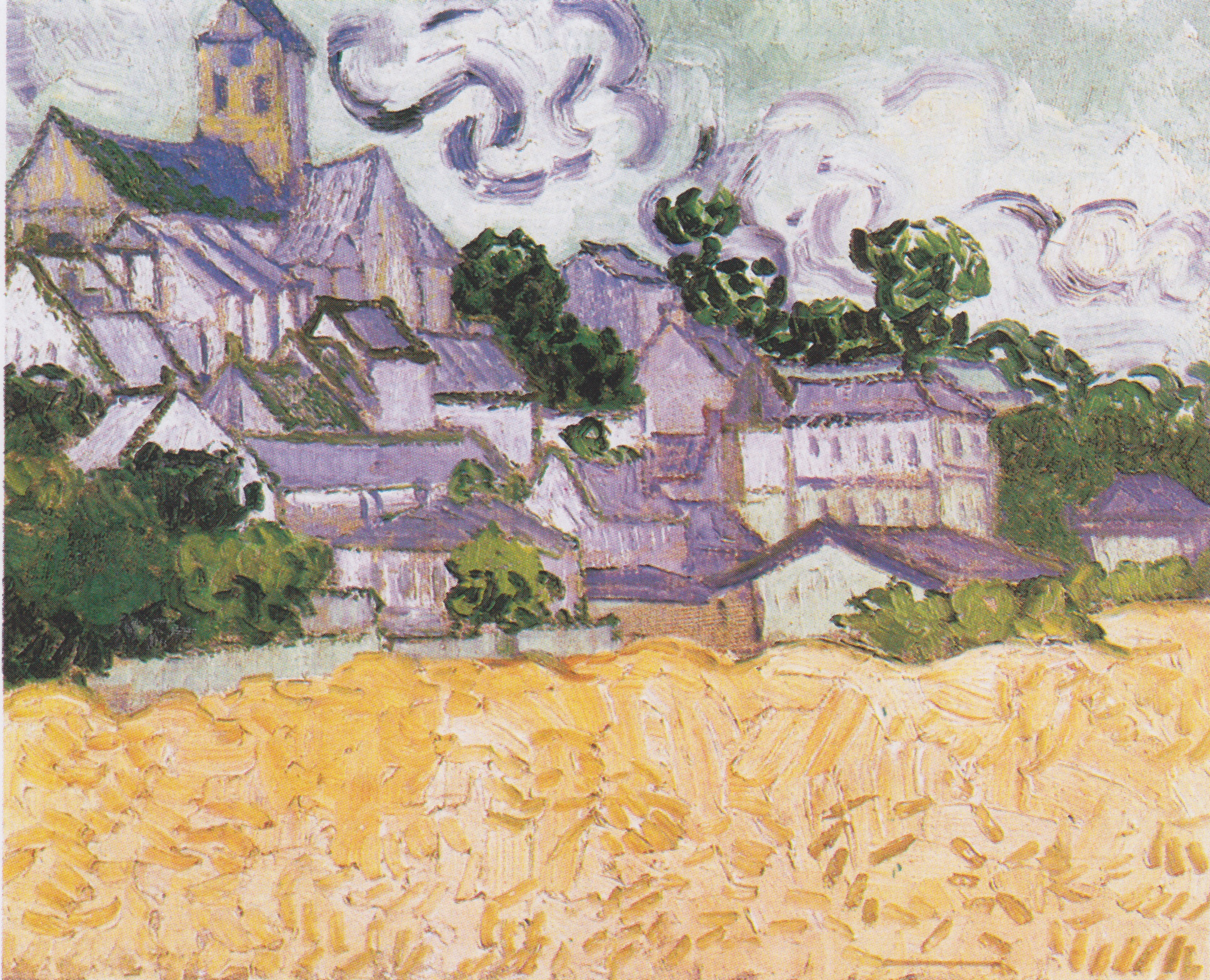
View of Auvers with Church, 1890, Private collection (F800)

== See also ==
- Vincent van Gogh article
- Early works of Vincent van Gogh
- List of works by Vincent van Gogh
- Van Gogh's family in his art which includes paintings of the Nuenen church and parsonage his father, Reverend Theordus van Gogh served.
- Peasant Character Studies (Van Gogh series)
