= Beach at Scheveningen in Stormy Weather =

Painting by Vincent van Gogh

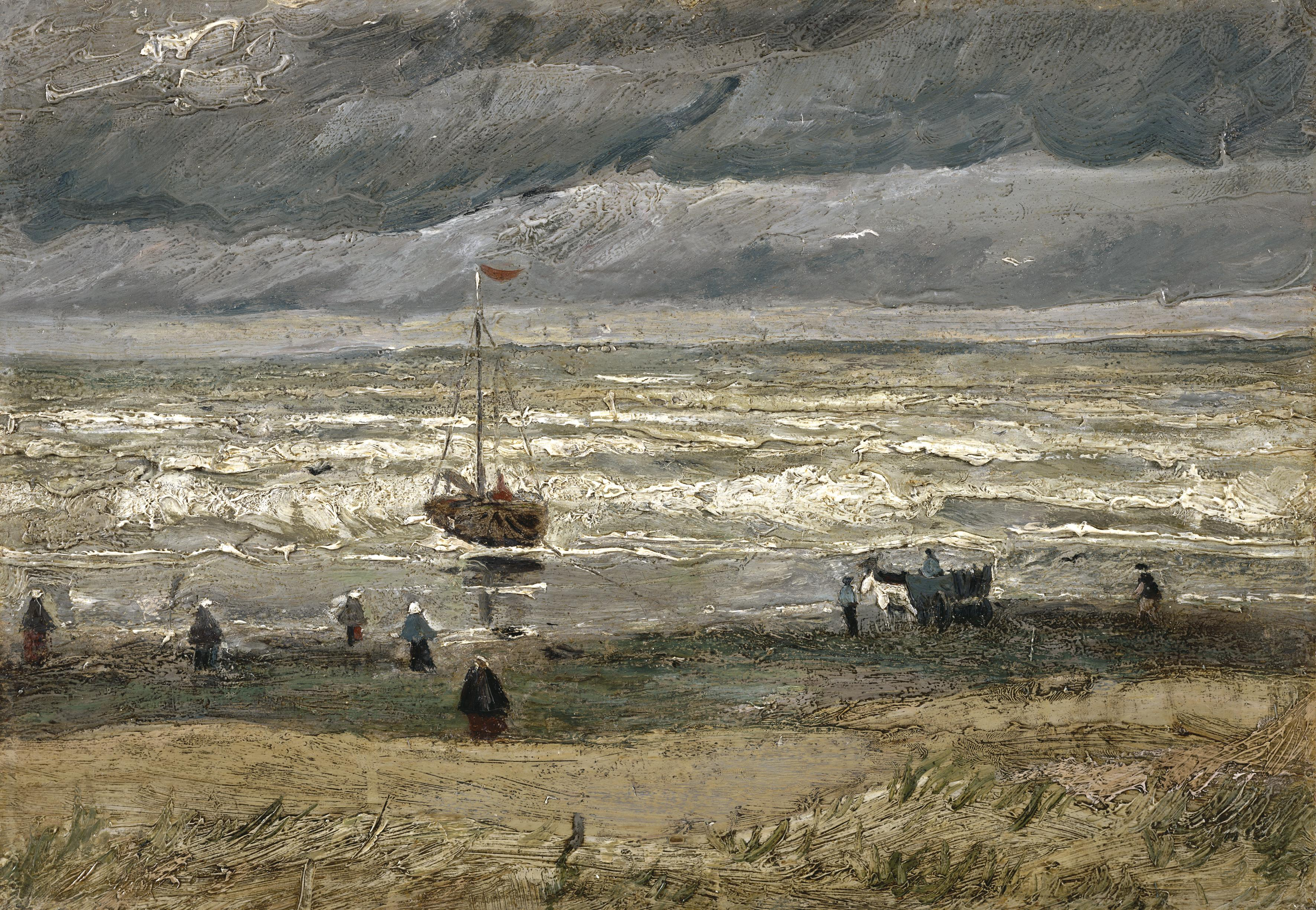
- Artist: Vincent van Gogh
- Year: 1882
- Catalogue: F4; JH187
- Medium: Oil on canvas
- Dimensions: 34.5 cm × 51.0 cm (13.6 in × 20.1 in)
- Location: Van Gogh Museum; Amsterdam

Beach at Scheveningen in Stormy Weather, also known as View of the Sea at Scheveningen (Dutch: Zeegezicht bij Scheveningen), is an early oil painting by Vincent van Gogh, painted at Scheveningen near The Hague in August 1882. It is held in the Van Gogh Museum in Amsterdam.

== Description ==
Van Gogh made his first paintings in December 1881, under the supervision of Anton Mauve, the husband of Van Gogh's cousin, Ariëtte (Jet) Sophia Jeannette Carbentus. This work was made in Van Gogh's second attempt at painting in August 1882.

The painting shows the beach at Scheveningen, on the North Sea coast a few miles from The Hague, on a stormy day on 21 or 22 August 1882. The painting was made quickly, en plein air, on an easel at the beach, with the wind whipping up sand and nearly blowing Van Gogh off his feet. He managed to scrape most of the wind-blown sand off the thick wet painting, but some remains.

The painting is an Impressionist take on the grey-tinged seascapes of Hague School paintings such as Hendrik Mesdag's 1881 Panorama of Scheveningen. The composition is broken into three horizontal zones: a threatening grey sky with dark roiling clouds, the greenish-grey sea with lines of white-capped waves crashing onto the shore, and the beach and sand dunes in browns, oranges, yellows and greens. A number of people are on the beach, some fishwives in their white bonnets, watching as a group of men with horses and a cart are about to pull on a rope attached to a waiting fishing boat to bring it safely ashore. The people are suggested by a few economical brushstrokes, and the breakers by thick lines of paint applied directly from the tube.

The work measures 34.5 by 51 centimetres (13.6 in × 20.1 in). It was catalogued as "F4" in Jacob Baart de la Faille's 1928 The Works of Vincent van Gogh and as "JH187" in Jan Hulsker's 1978 The Complete Van Gogh.

The painting was stored at the Van Gogh family house in Breda. Along with many early other works, it was left behind in the attic when the family moved away in 1886, and it came into the possession of a carpenter, Adrianus Schrauwen. It was sold as part of a job lot of worthless "rubbish" to the merchant J.C. Couvreur in 1902, and it came to Kunstzalen Oldenzeel in Rotterdam. It was bought by tobacco importer Gerlach Ribbius Peletier in 1903 for the record price of 2,500 guilders, when other works by Van Gogh were selling for less than 1,000 guilders. It was inherited by his daughter Liesbeth Ribbius Peletier, and she donated it to the state of the Netherlands on her death in 1989.

== Theft and recovery ==
Beach at Scheveningen in Stormy Weather had been held by the Van Gogh Museum in Amsterdam since 1989 but was stolen, along with Van Gogh's later painting of Congregation Leaving the Reformed Church in Nuenen, on 7 December 2002. It remained missing for over 13 years, until it was recovered in January 2016 by the Italian Guardia di Finanza, together with the other stolen work, at Castellammare di Stabia near Naples. Its recovery, without its original frame, from under the kitchen floor of a villa associated with Camorra gang boss Raffaele Imperiale was not announced until September 2016. It was subsequently returned to the Van Gogh Museum and after some restoration went back on display in March 2017.

== See also ==
- List of works by Vincent van Gogh
- Early works of Vincent van Gogh
- List of stolen paintings
