= Congregation Leaving the Reformed Church in Nuenen =

Painting by Vincent van Gogh

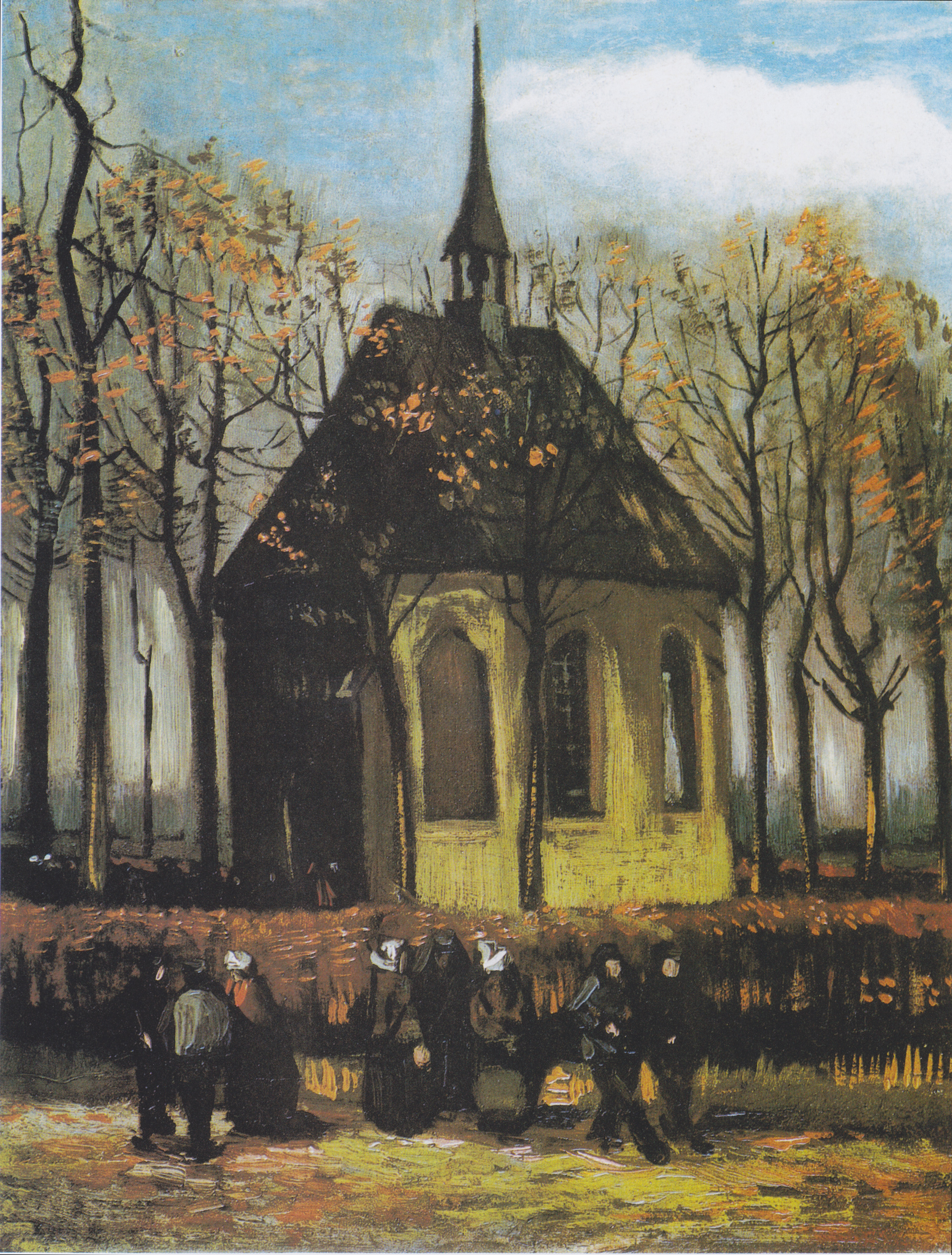
- Artist: Vincent van Gogh
- Year: 1884–1885
- Catalogue: F25; JH521
- Medium: Oil on canvas
- Dimensions: 41.3 cm × 32.1 cm (16.3 in × 12.6 in)
- Location: Van Gogh Museum; Amsterdam

Congregation Leaving the Reformed Church at Nuenen (Dutch: Het uitgaan van de hervormde kerk te Nuenen) is an early painting by Vincent van Gogh, made in early 1884 and modified in late 1885. It is displayed at the Van Gogh Museum in Amsterdam.

== Description ==
The work was painted in Nuenen, a small village in the North Brabant district of the Netherlands, a few miles northeast of Eindhoven. Van Gogh's father became the pastor of the Dutch Reformed Church in Nuenen in 1882, and Van Gogh lived with his parents at the vicarage in Nuenen from December 1883 to May 1885. During this time, he made a number of paintings of the local peasants, including The Potato Eaters, and also paintings of the church.

The oil on canvas painting measures 41.5 by 32 centimetres (16.3 in × 12.6 in). It was made in January or February 1884, showing Van Gogh's father's small church, with hedge and bare trees. Van Gogh made the painting for his mother, while she was confined to her house with a broken leg. It was based on an earlier sketch; like the sketch, the painting originally included a peasant with a spade in the foreground, but it later painted out - probably in late 1885 - when Van Gogh also added the congregation, and leaves to bare trees. The congregation are in mourning clothes: Van Gogh's father had died in March 1885 and Vincent may have added the woman in mourning and congregation members for his mother as a memorial for his father's death.

It is catalogued as "F25" in Jacob Baart de la Faille's 1928 The Works of Vincent van Gogh and as "JH521" in Jan Hulsker's 1978 The Complete Van Gogh.

== Theft and recovery ==
Congregation Leaving the Reformed Church in Nuenen is held by the Van Gogh Museum in Amsterdam. It was stolen on 7 December 2002, along with Van Gogh's early painting of Beach at Scheveningen in Stormy Weather, and remained missing for over 13 years until it was recovered by the Italian Guardia di Finanza at Castellammare di Stabia near Naples in January 2016, without its original frame. Its recovery was not announced until September 2016, and it was subsequently returned to the museum and went back on display in March 2017.

== See also ==
- Old Church Tower at Nuenen
- Early works of Vincent van Gogh
- List of works by Vincent van Gogh
- Van Gogh's family in his art
- List of stolen paintings
