= Sien (Van Gogh series) =

Dutch tailor and prostitute

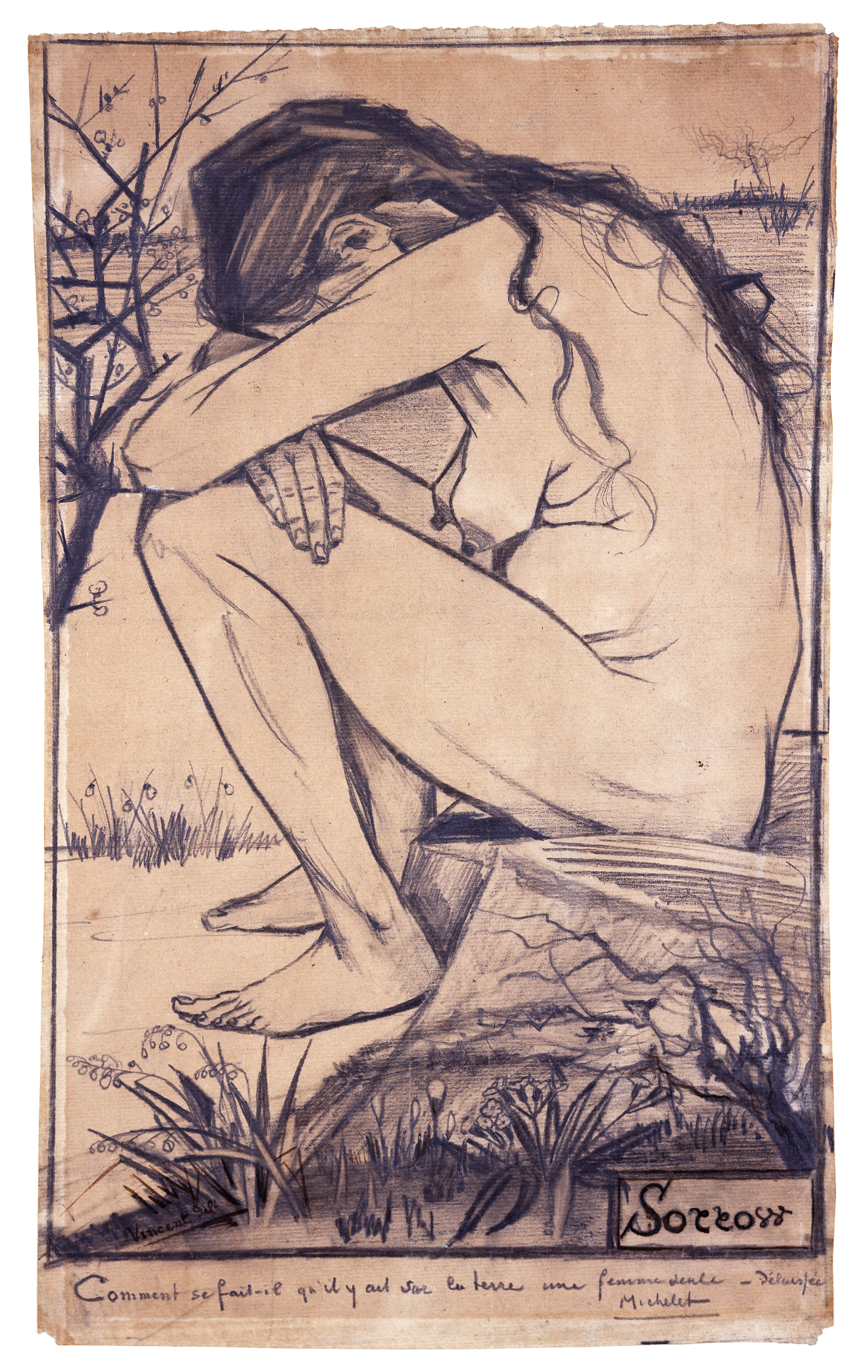
Sorrow, drawing in chalk, the Garman Ryan Collection, at The New Art Gallery Walsall (F929a)

Vincent van Gogh drew and painted a series of works of his mistress Sien during their time together in the Netherlands. In particular, his drawing Sorrow is widely acknowledged as a masterwork of draftsmanship, the culmination of a long and sometimes uncertain apprenticeship in learning his craft.

Commonly called Sien Hoornik, Clasina Maria Hoornik (1850–1904) lived with van Gogh during much of his time in The Hague from 1881 to 1883. Van Gogh used Sien, a pregnant prostitute, as a model for his work and later took Sien and her daughter into his home. Van Gogh made drawings and paintings of Sien and her daughter, baby and mother over that period, which reflected the domestic life and hardships of the working poor. Their relationship was not accepted by his family or supporters, although his brother Theo did not withdraw his support over it. It did contribute however, to a split with Anton Mauve, a cousin-in-law and noted painter of the Hague School, who had introduced Van Gogh to painting as well as supporting him financially, and whom Van Gogh revered. At his brother Theo's urging, Van Gogh left Sien in 1883 to paint in Drenthe, ending the only domestic relationship he would ever have.

Sien resumed her life as a seamstress, cleaning woman and likely prostitute before marrying in 1901. On 22 November 1904, aged 54, she threw herself into the Schelde river and drowned, fulfilling a prediction she had made to Van Gogh in 1883: "what the bad moods are is still more desperate ... 'it's bound to end up with me jumping into the water.'"

== Estrangement from family ==
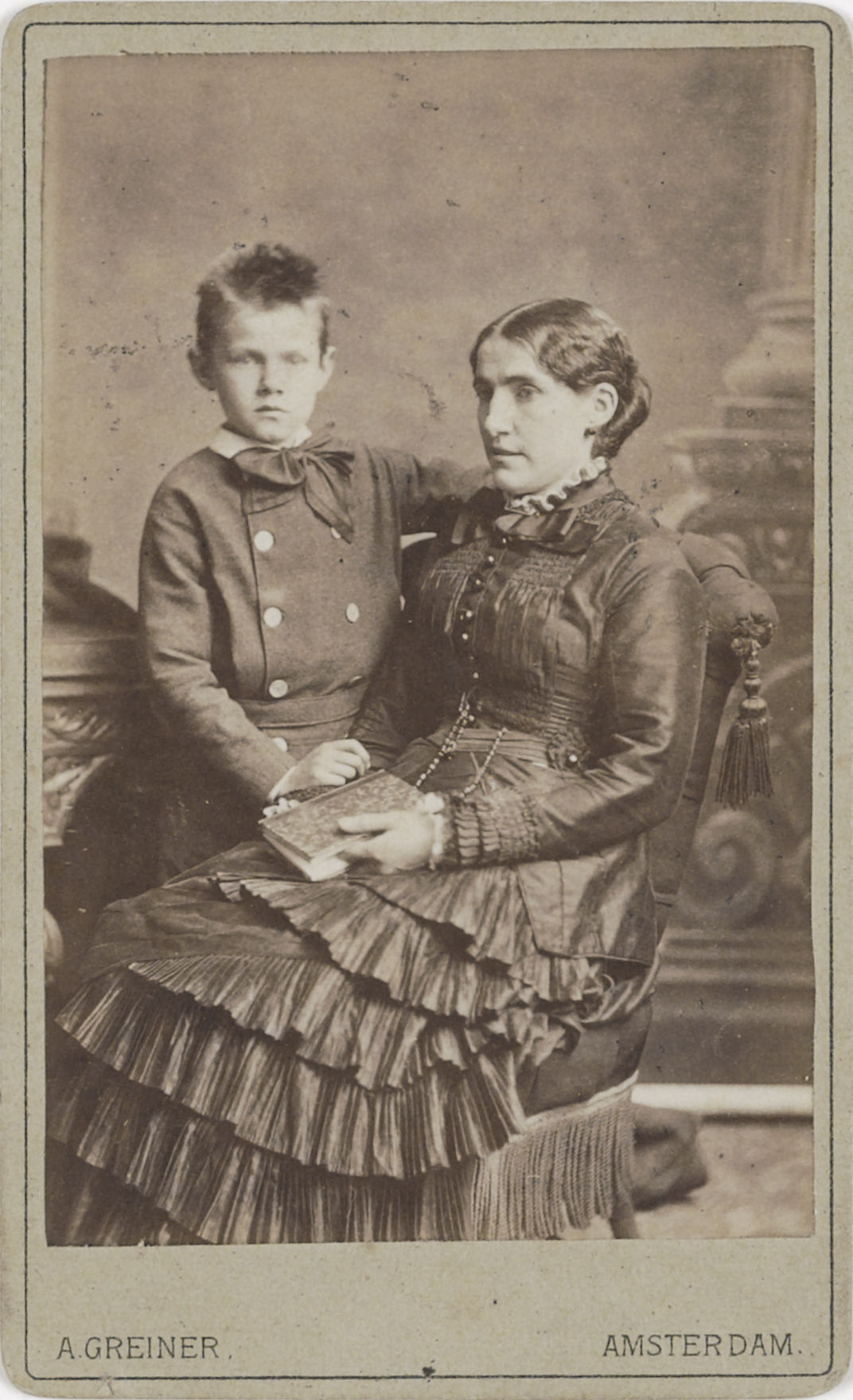
Kee Vos Stricker with her son Jan c. 1879/1880

In the summer of 1881, Van Gogh fell in love with his recently widowed first cousin, Kee Vos Stricker. He proposed marriage, but was rebuffed with an adamant "no, nay, never" ("nooit, neen, nimmer"). Undeterred, he nevertheless continued to press his attentions despite the increasing dismay and disapproval of his family which eventually led to his leaving the family home for a while to study drawing at The Hague with his cousin-in-law Anton Mauve.

Mauve was a successful and noted artist, a leading member of the Hague School and a master colorist whose paintings found a ready market both home and abroad. He had married Van Gogh's cousin, Ariëtte (Jet) Carbentus, in 1874 while she was still very young and he was already established and successful, and as such was lionized by the Van Gogh family. At the time, he was busy with his massive Fishing Boat on the Beach that he was preparing for the next year's Salon, but he nevertheless found time for Van Gogh to advise him on his drawings, inviting him to return in a few months time to review progress.

After a last, humiliating effort to win Kee over, an episode that severely rocked his religious faith, Van Gogh returned to his parents' home in Etten in late 1881. On Christmas Day that year, he refused to attend church, provoking a violent quarrel with his father, a pastor, which resulted in his leaving home the very same day.

Van Gogh returned to The Hague and studied further under Mauve. Mauve helped him to establish a modest studio on the Schenkweg on the outer fringes of The Hague, lending him money to purchase furniture, and introduced him to the Pulchri Studio, The Hague's most important art society in which he himself played a major role. He also introduced Van Gogh to painting, first in oils and then with watercolor.

== Sien ==
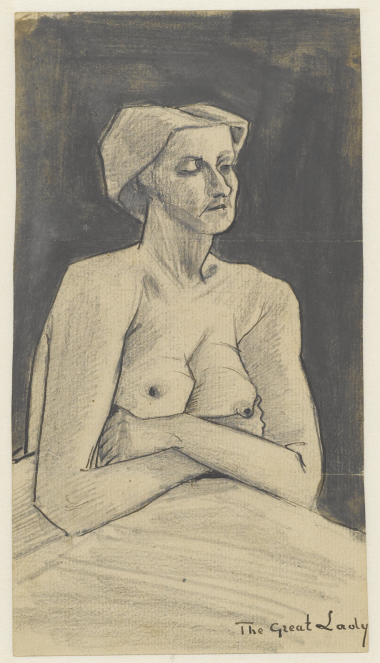
The Great Lady, sketch in letter 215, Van Gogh Museum (F-, JH128)

At the end of January 1882, Van Gogh met a homeless, pregnant prostitute named Clasina (Sien) Maria Hoornik who had been deserted by the father of the child she was carrying. The exact date of this meeting is not known beyond Van Gogh's dating of it in a letter to Theo written in May. However, another letter written mid-January mentions he was negotiating modelling with "a mother with a little child", who may have been Sien. It has also been suggested that the woman he "found" following his humiliating rejection by his cousin Kee Vos, as described in a letter to Theo around 23 December the preceding year and immediately before his final estrangement from his father that Christmas Day, was in fact Sien, although there is no direct evidence for the surmise. Based on the dates, Van Gogh could not have been the father of the child.

Sien was born in 1850, the eldest of ten children of Pieter Hoornik, a porter in the poor district of the Geest, and his wife. Pieter died in 1875. To provide for the family, Sien and her mother worked as seamstresses and cleaned homes. Their earnings were supplemented by what Sien's brother, Pieter, could provide from the income of his chair-making business. The family often relied upon public assistance. For a time Sien and some of her siblings lived at a Catholic orphanage, relying on assistance from the public soup kitchen and church charities. So meager were her earnings, she turned to prostitution for a better income. By the age of 32, the unmarried Sien had given birth to four children, two of whom lived: Maria Wilhelmina, born about 1877, and Willem, born July 1882. Sien experienced poor health due to the post-operative effects of earlier surgeries, illness, and venereal disease, which she seems to have passed to Van Gogh, who was hospitalized in June 1882 for gonorrhea.

Sien posed for Van Gogh throughout the winter. In exchange, Van Gogh provided Sien and her daughter with a place to live and food to eat. Sien was ill when he met her and he did what he could to nurse her back to health. Van Gogh considered marrying Sien to take care of her and keep her off the streets. He envisioned a life where Sien would be his helpmate, helping him further his artistic career. Sien wanted to be married to him, too, even though he was poor. His family, including his brother and supporter Theo, opposed the relationship and his hope for continued support was doubtful.

In June 1882, Van Gogh was hospitalized for gonorrhea. Disobeying doctor's orders, he left the hospital on 1 July to visit Sien in Leiden, where she had just given birth to a baby boy. Van Gogh moved to a larger studio next door with Sien and her two children. Sien required an extended period of recovery from a difficult pregnancy and delivery. The baby boy, though, seemed to bring much happiness to Van Gogh. He explained that while he endeavored to go deeper as an artist, he was also looking to do so as a man.

== Reaction to his relationship with Sien ==
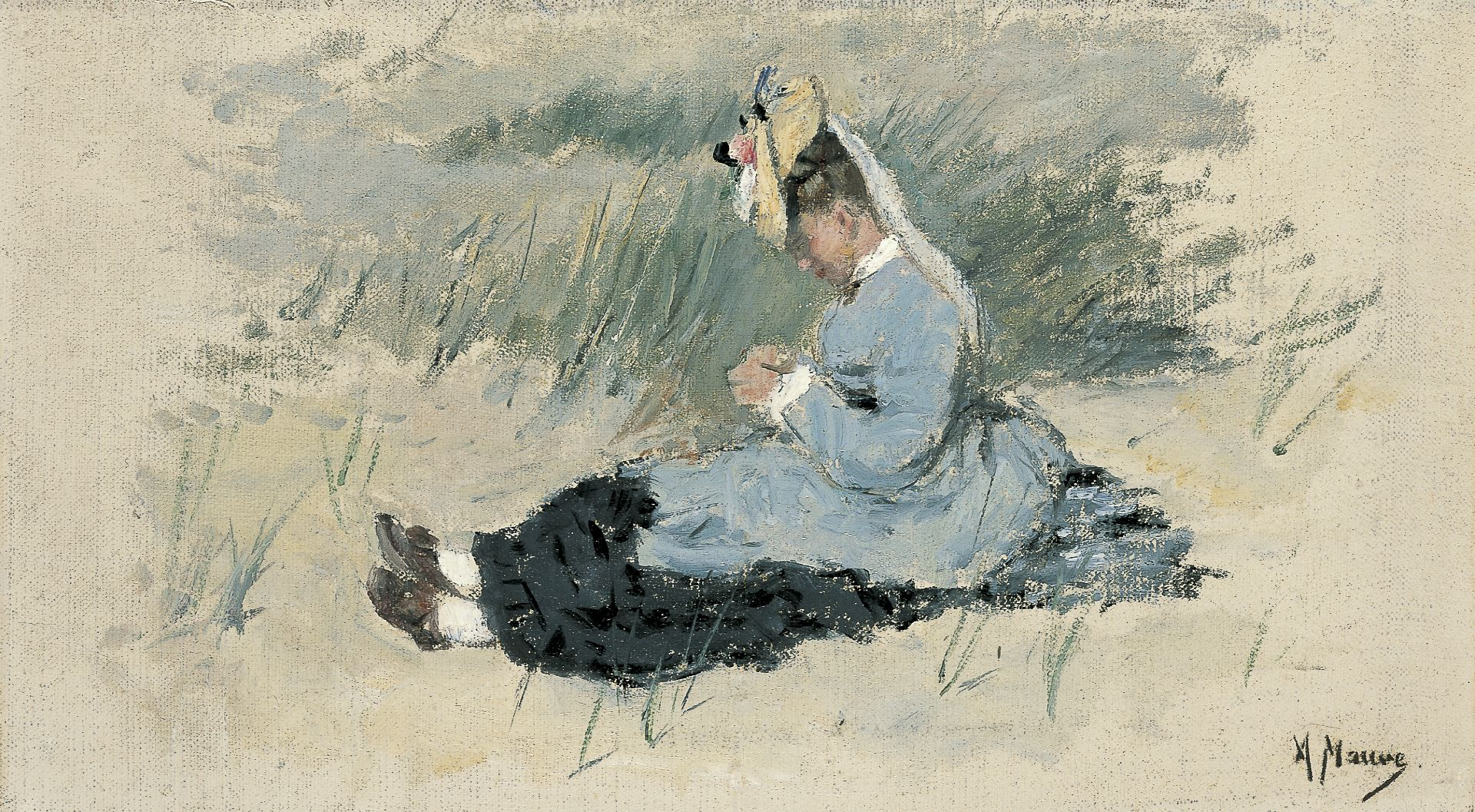
Anton Mauve – Ariëtte (Jet) Carbentus, the Artist's Wife, in the Dunes. Jet Carbentus was a cousin of Van Gogh on his mother's side.

As a result of his relationship with Sien, Van Gogh experienced the loss of support and goodwill from family and friends and his relationship with his parents was further strained. His teacher and cousin-in-law, Anton Mauve, abruptly ceased his support and tutelage within a few weeks of Van Gogh first meeting Sien, although there were other factors involved as well, not least their mutual melancholy. Hulsker called this a simple tragedy for Van Gogh. Likewise, a long-standing family friend, Hermanus Tersteeg, an influential art dealer who taught Van Gogh and his brother Theo a great deal about art and literature, and who gave Van Gogh his first set of art supplies when he decided to become an artist, although he was always somewhat equivocal in his support, abruptly withdrew at the same time.

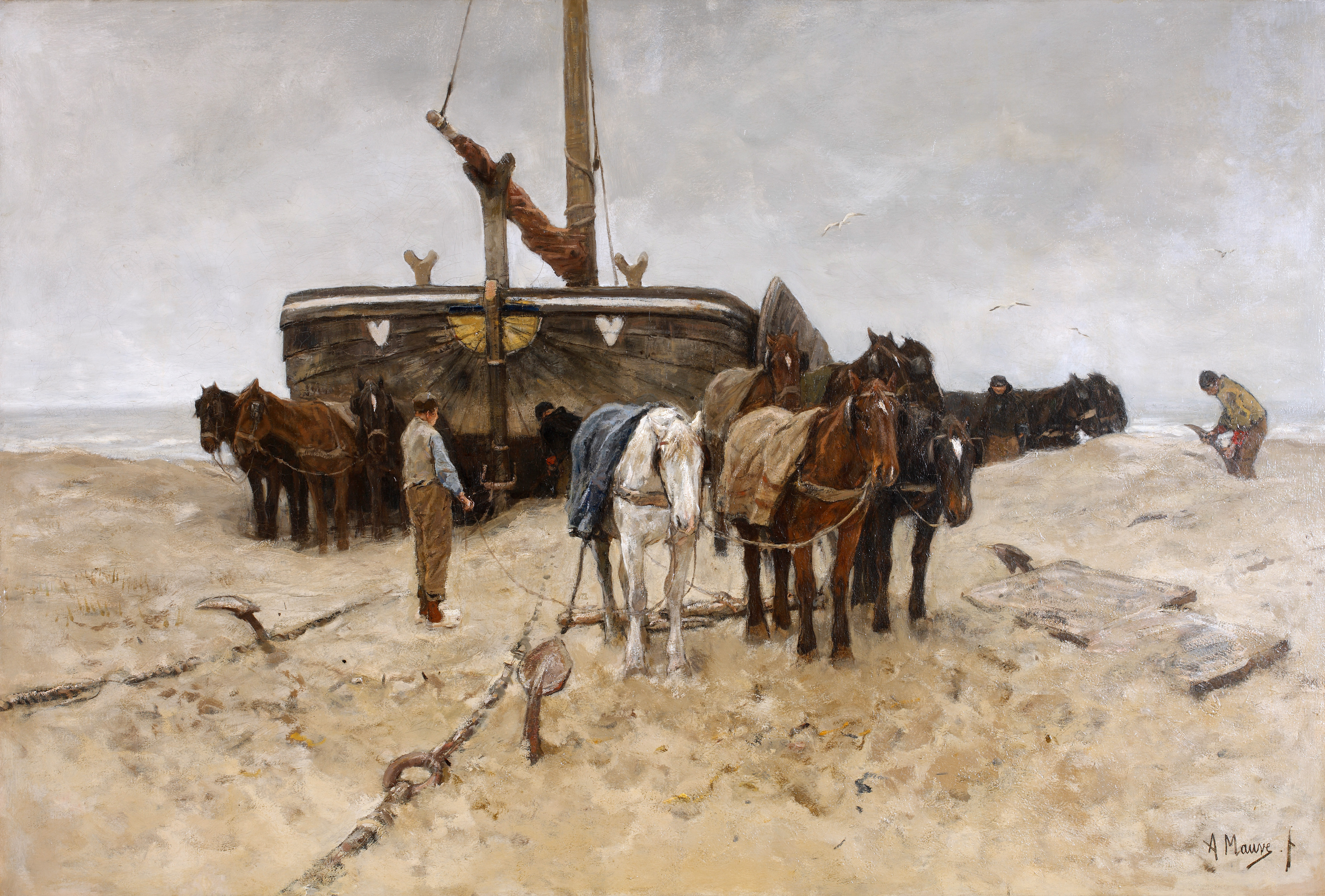
Anton Mauve – Fishing boat on the beach, 115 x 172 cm. This was the painting Mauve was working on at the time of his dealings with Van Gogh. It was shown in May at the Salon of 1882. Gemeentemuseum, The Hague.

Van Gogh's relationship with Mauve in truth had scarcely lasted a month. Already by the end of January, he was writing to his brother Theo that he did not always find it easy to get along with Mauve. Shortly after this, they fell out with each other over an issue involving drawing from plaster casts, which Mauve was anxious Van Gogh should undertake to perfect his technique. Van Gogh, however, vehemently insisted on drawing from models, and in a fit of pique destroyed some plaster casts of hands and feet that Mauve had given him to make studies from. Following that incident, Mauve said he would have nothing more to do with him for the next two months (i.e., for the rest of the winter). In reality, Mauve had resolved to break with Van Gogh completely. Van Gogh initially blamed Tersteeg for Mauve's indifference, but a chance meeting with Mauve in May made it clear to him that Mauve had definitively broken with him. He described the meeting in a letter to Theo, and in the same letter he revealed his relationship with Sien for the first time and passionately defended it:

People suspect me of something... it's in the air... I must be hiding something... Vincent is keeping something back that may not be divulged.. Well, gentlemen, I’ll tell you – you who set great store by manners and culture, and rightly so, provided it's the real thing – what is more cultured, more sensitive, more manly: to forsake a woman or to take on a forsaken one?

Van Gogh left Sien the autumn of 1883 and went to Drenthe to paint. Sien went back to work as a seamstress, charwoman and possibly as a prostitute. Her children, Maria and Willem, lived with Sien's mother and brother Pieter. In 1901, Sien married a seaman, Anton van Wijk. She committed suicide in 1904 at the age of 54 in Rotterdam's harbor, 14 years after Van Gogh's death.

== Depiction of families ==
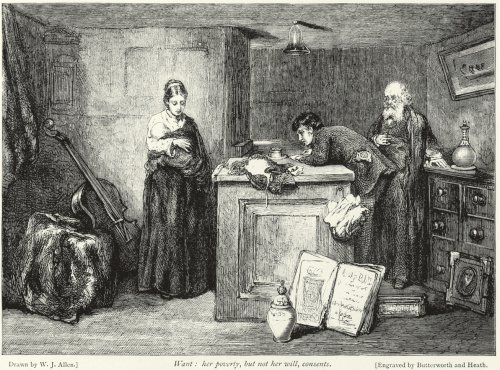
Francis Montague Holl – Want: Her poverty, but not her will, consents, 1876. The print depicts a woman hesitatingly pawning her wedding ring while the pawnbroker and his assistant look on pityingly. Cited by Van Gogh in a letter to his contemporary and mentor Anthon van Rappard defending his relationship with Sien: "Her only chance of surviving ... was to lead a well-ordered, domestic life. ... As to her life, I believe that, like me, you don’t condemn fallen women."

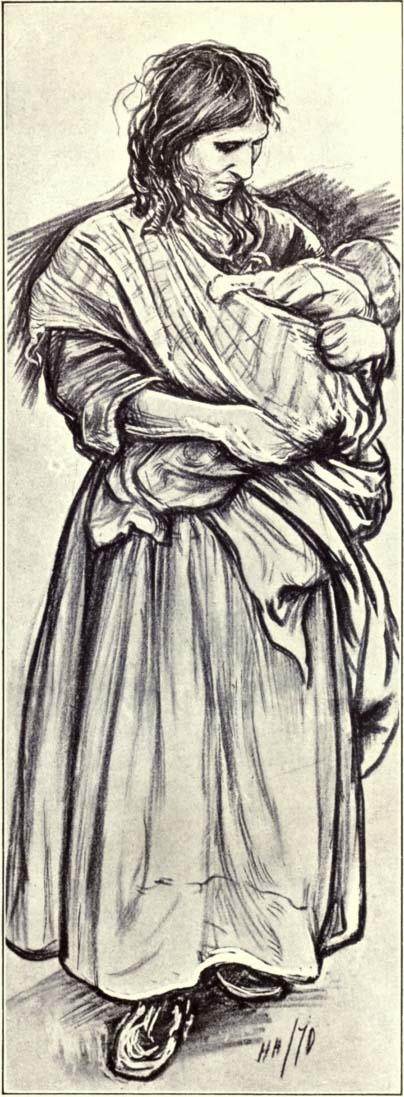
Hubert von Herkomer – Gipsy Woman with Child, 1870 (Herkomer's first work for The Graphic)

Throughout his career, Van Gogh made few portraits of his close artistic friends or family members. In particular, no portraits were thought to exist even of his brother Theo, by far the closest to him. However, in 2011, the Van Gogh Museum's senior researcher, Louis van Tilborgh, announced that he was satisfied that one of the many self-portraits by Van Gogh is in fact a portrait of his brother Theo. His conclusion was based on a number of striking differences between their features. Theo's portrait, made in 1887, shows a man with shaved cheeks. Theo's beard is not red like Vincent's, but more ochre. On top of that, this man's ear has a fine rounded shell, unlike Vincent's but like Theo's.

Vincent had a particular interest in painting families of the working class, as seen in The Potato Eaters, his The Roulin Family series. He was influenced especially by the social realism of the English illustrators, such as Hubert von Herkomer, Samuel Luke Fildes, and Frank Holl, working for The Graphic, a British weekly illustrated newspaper founded by the social reformer William Luson Thomas. Van Gogh frequently referred to them in his letters, and he had obtained a complete set of back numbers of The Graphic between 1870 and 1880, decorating his studio with his favorite prints.

By August 1882, he had taken up painting in oils in earnest but, despite a promising start, abruptly abandoned it after a month, not to resume again until the following summer. Part of the reason was undoubtedly the expense of painting in oils, but Naifeh and Smith suggest the real reason was that at that time his heart lay in drawing. In his moving letter of 16 May 1882, describing his final humiliation from the family of Kee Vos and how he had come to meet Sien and his relationship with her, he wrote:

I want to go through the domestic joys and sorrows myself so that I can draw them from experience. After I had left Amsterdam I felt that my love, which was truly honest, truly unfeigned and strong, had been literally beaten to death – yet after death one rises from the dead. Resurgam. Then I found Christien ...

By September, Sien had recovered from her difficult confinement and was ready to pose again. At the same time, Van Gogh had discovered his orphan man, Adrianus Jacobus Zuyderland, who was to become his favourite and most patient model. With the winter drawing in and working outdoors increasingly difficult, Van Gogh retreated to his studio and returned to drawing figures. He used the remaining canvas from his work in oils to shutter his windows and adjust the light falling on his models.

== Works ==
=== Sien ===
The works of Sien, a 32-year-old prostitute and seamstress, often depict her in traditional domestic feminine roles: a mother, seamstress, and domestic worker. In the drawing Sorrow (F929, F929a) and a subsequent lithograph (F1655), Sien represents a woman's sorrow and frailty. Some of the works are iconic, such as Woman Seated (F935, JH143) and Mother with Child. When Van Gogh made drawings of Sien sewing, the compositions were simple as was her work. If she had been in a higher station in life, a painting of her sewing would no doubt have shown her performing embroidery. Rather than being an activity for enjoyment, Sien's sewing was one of drudgery.

Regarding Woman Seated, it is curious that he posed Sien in a dress identical to one worn by Kee Vos Stricker, as can be verified by the photograph of Kee Vos and her son catalogued in the Dutch national archive Geheugen van Nederland and held in the collection of the Van Gogh Museum, Amsterdam (reproduced top left).

In a letter van Gogh mentioned how he considered Sien his helpmate or partner in the creation of the works which depicted her. He would write Theo about his relationship with Sien, saying that it wasn't exactly love between them but rather a mutual understanding. Vincent took Sien off the streets and provided for her and her children, and in return she posed for him.

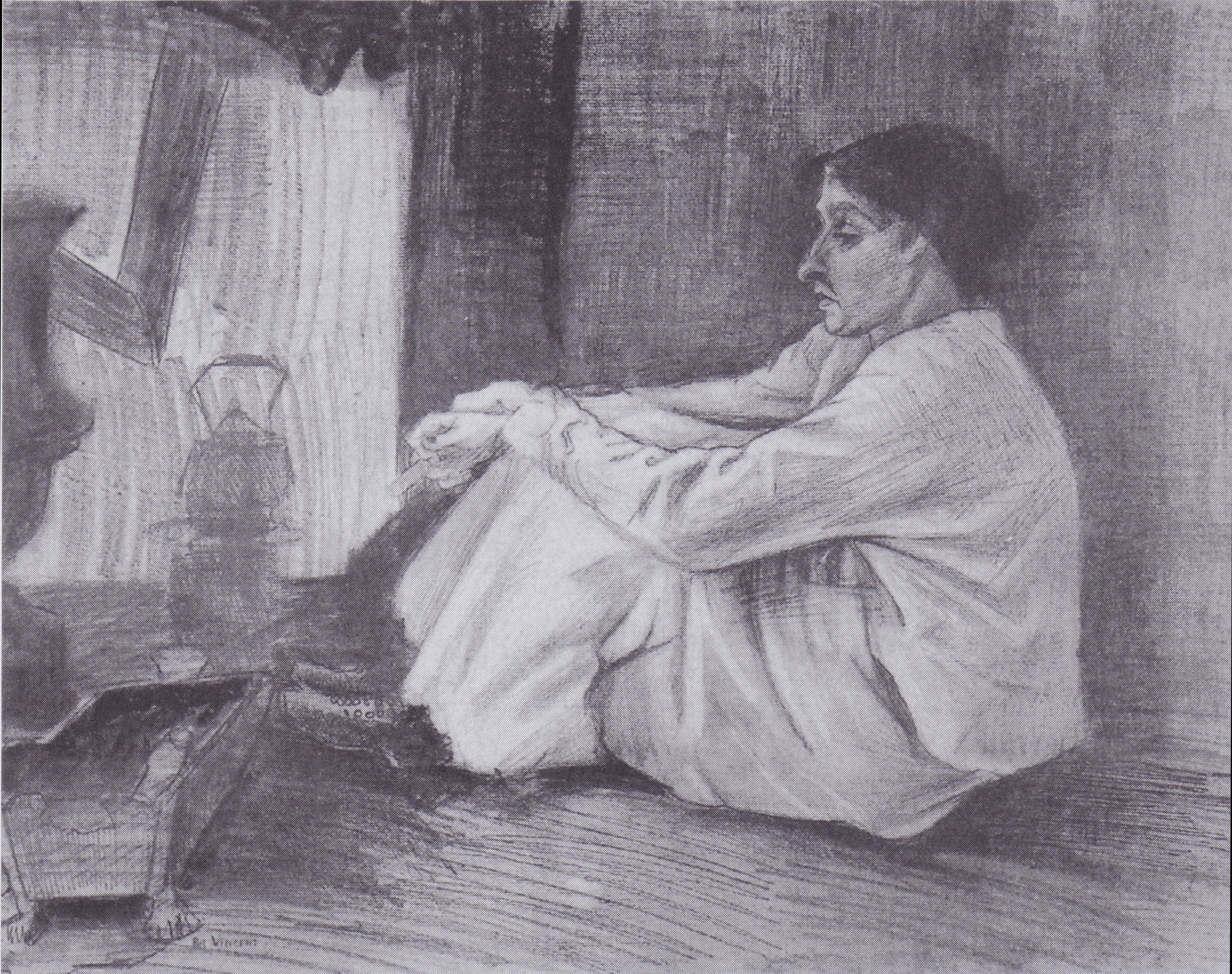
Sien with a cigar, sitting on the floor beside the fireplace, pencil, black chalk, pen and brush, sepia, washed and heightened with white, April 1882, Kröller-Müller Museum, Otterlo, Netherlands (F898, JH141)

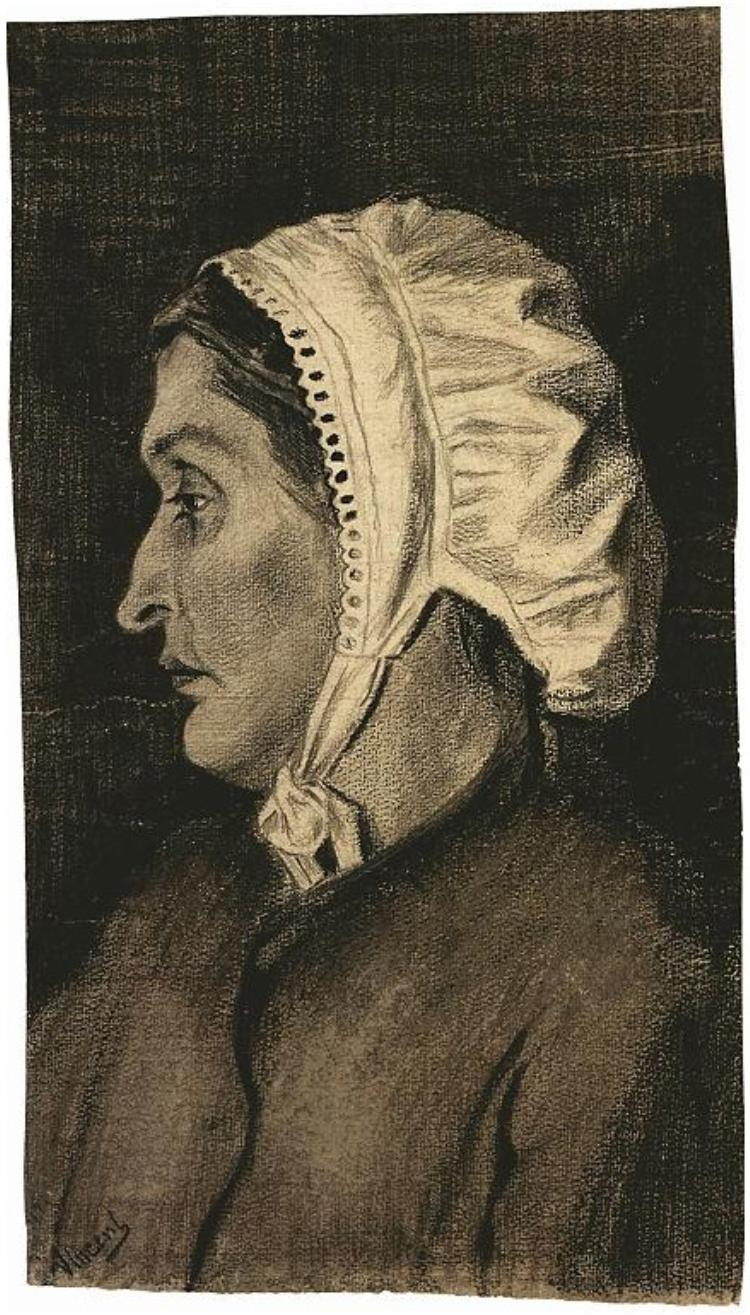
Sien in a White Bonnet, pencil, black lithographic chalk, washed, December 1882, Van Gogh Museum, Amsterdam, the Netherlands (F931, JH291)

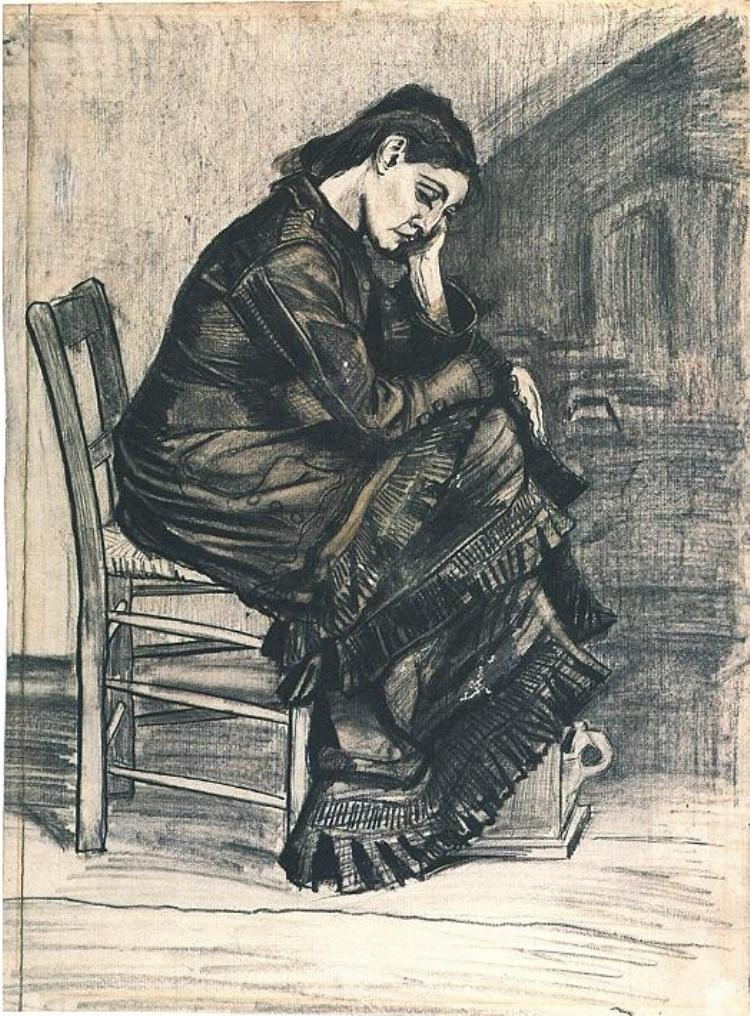
Woman Seated, pencil, pen and brush in black ink, brown/sepia wash, white opaque watercolour, traces of squaring, on laid paper (two sheets), April 1882, Kröller-Müller Museum, Otterlo, The Netherlands (F935, JH143)

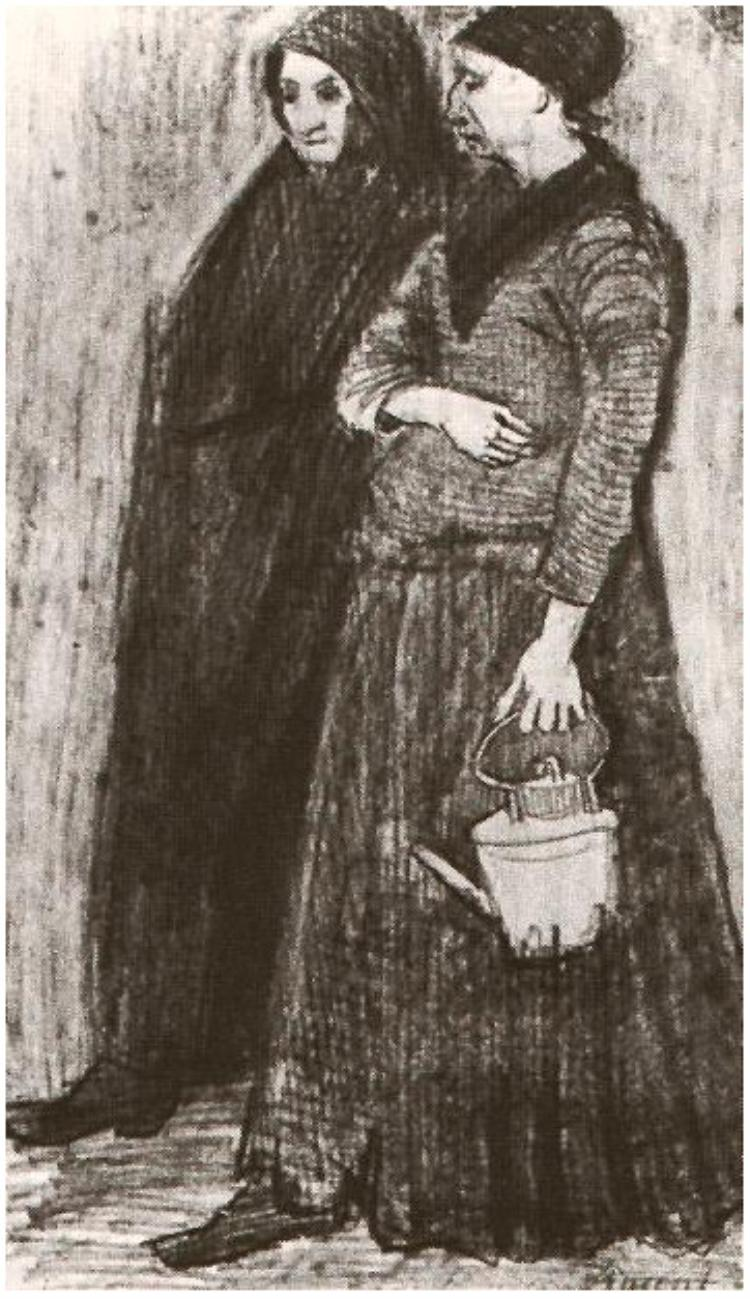
Two women strolling (pregnant Sien and her mother), pencil, first half of 1882, Private collection, Netherlands (F988a, JH148)

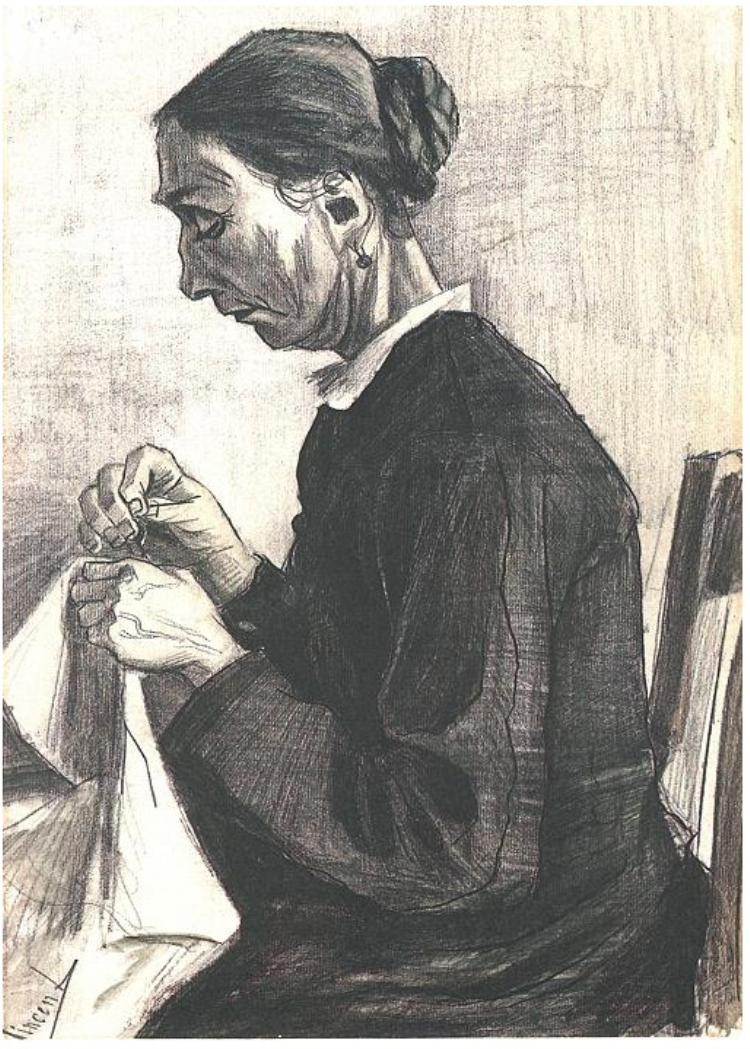
Sien, Sewing, Half-Figure, pencil, black mountain chalk 1883, Museum Boijmans Van Beuningen, Rotterdam, The Netherlands (F1025, JH346)

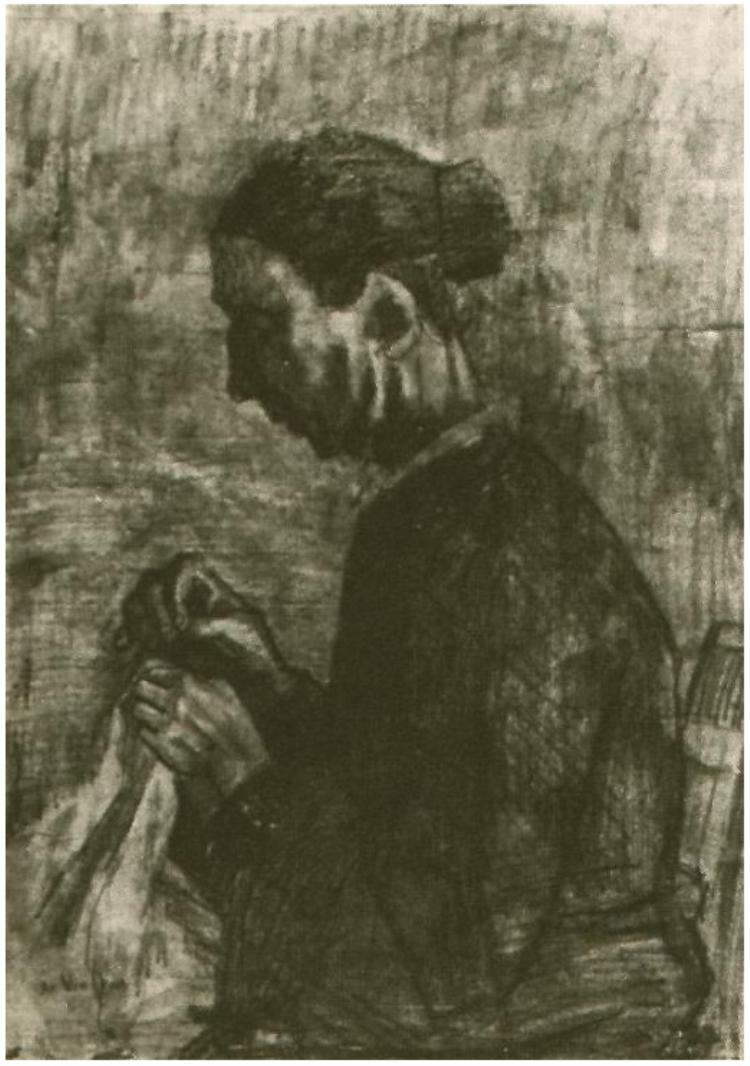
Sien, Sewing, Half-Figure, pencil, lightly washed, 1883, Kröller-Müller Museum, Otterlo, The Netherlands (F1026, JH347)

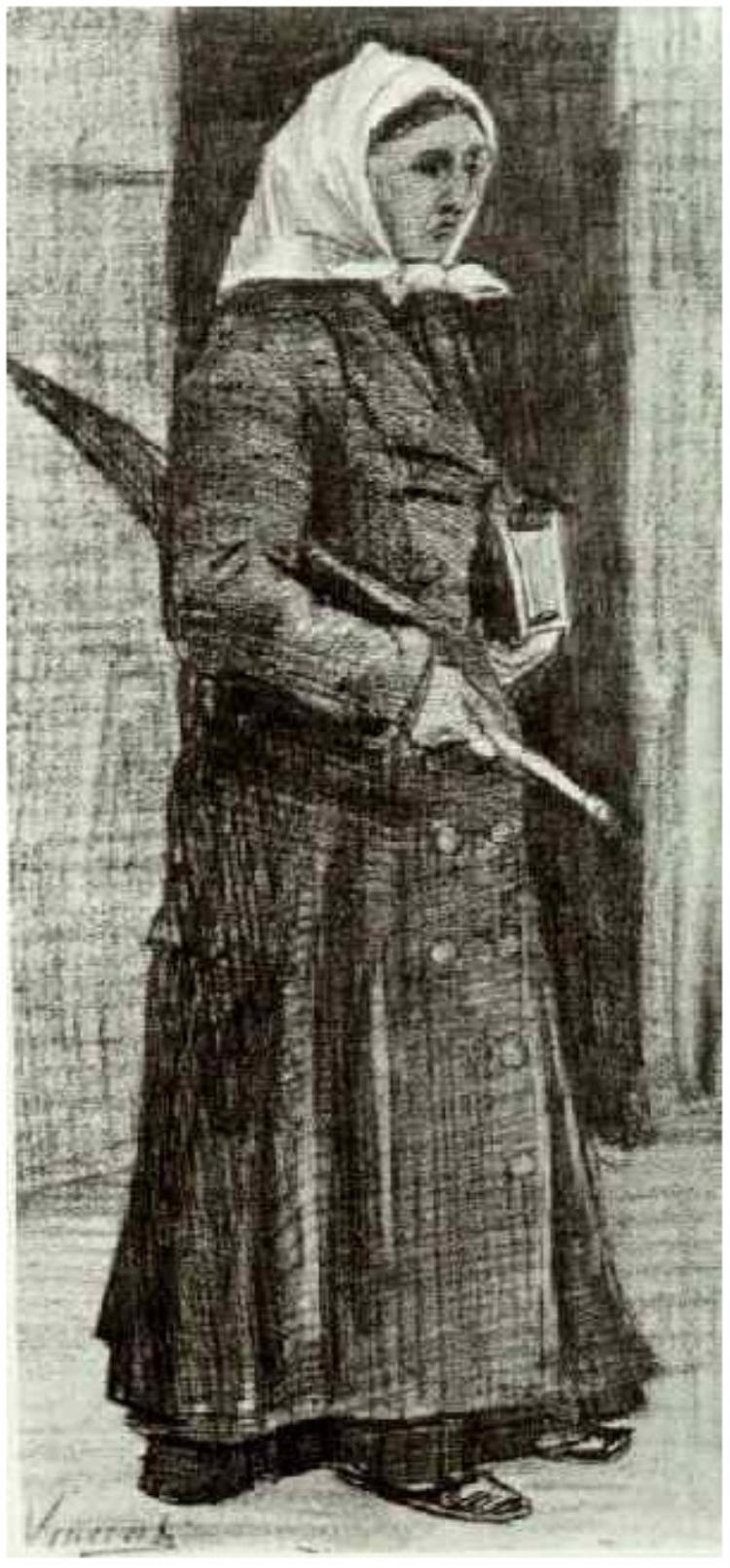
Sien with Umbrella and Prayer Book, pencil, black chalk, 1882, Private collection, (F1052, JH101). The signature at the lower left is false. Hulsker considers this to be one of the earliest Sien drawings.

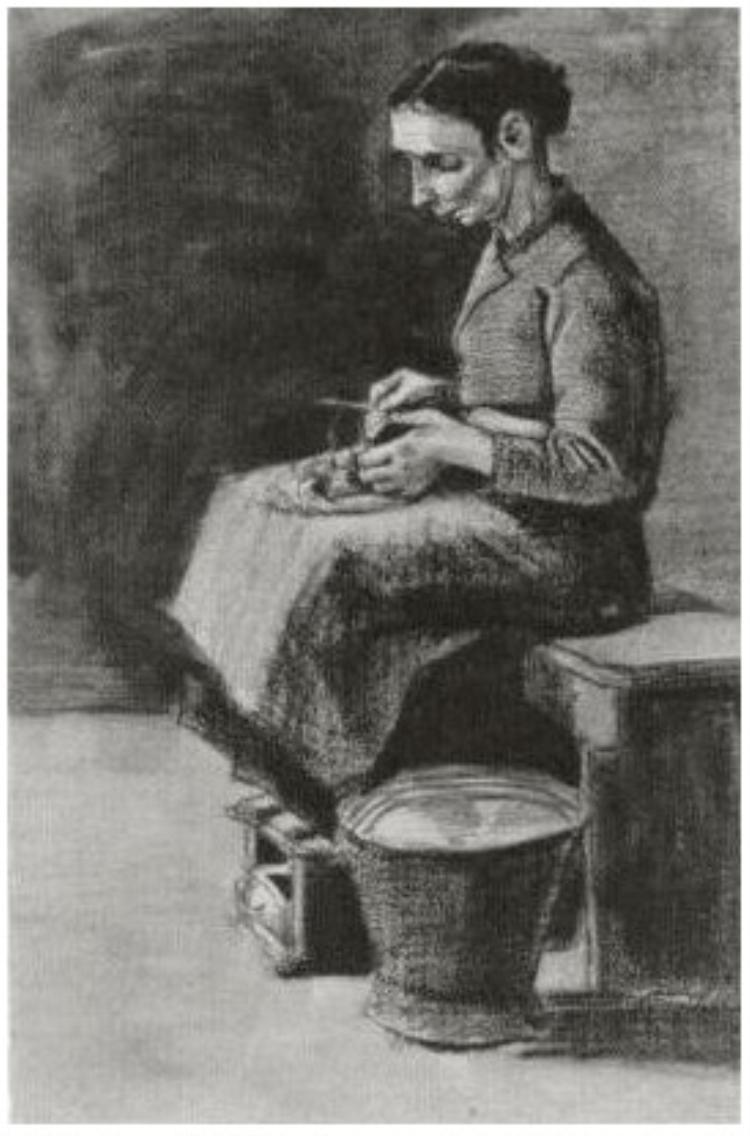
Sien Peeling Potatoes, black chalk, 1883, Gemeentemuseum Den Haag, The Hague, The Netherlands [on loan from Paul Citroen] (F1053a, JH358)

=== Sien with the baby, Willem ===
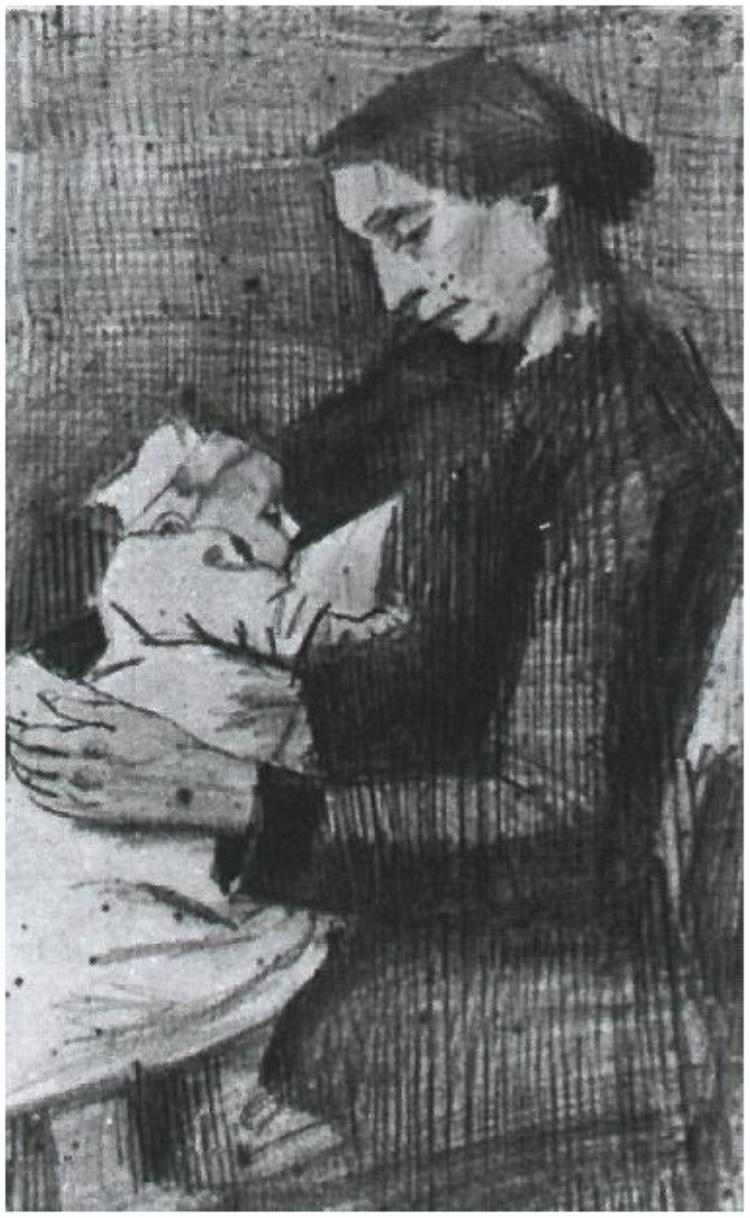
Sien Nursing Baby, Half-Figure, drawing, 1882, Kröller-Müller Museum, Otterlo, The Netherlands (F1062)

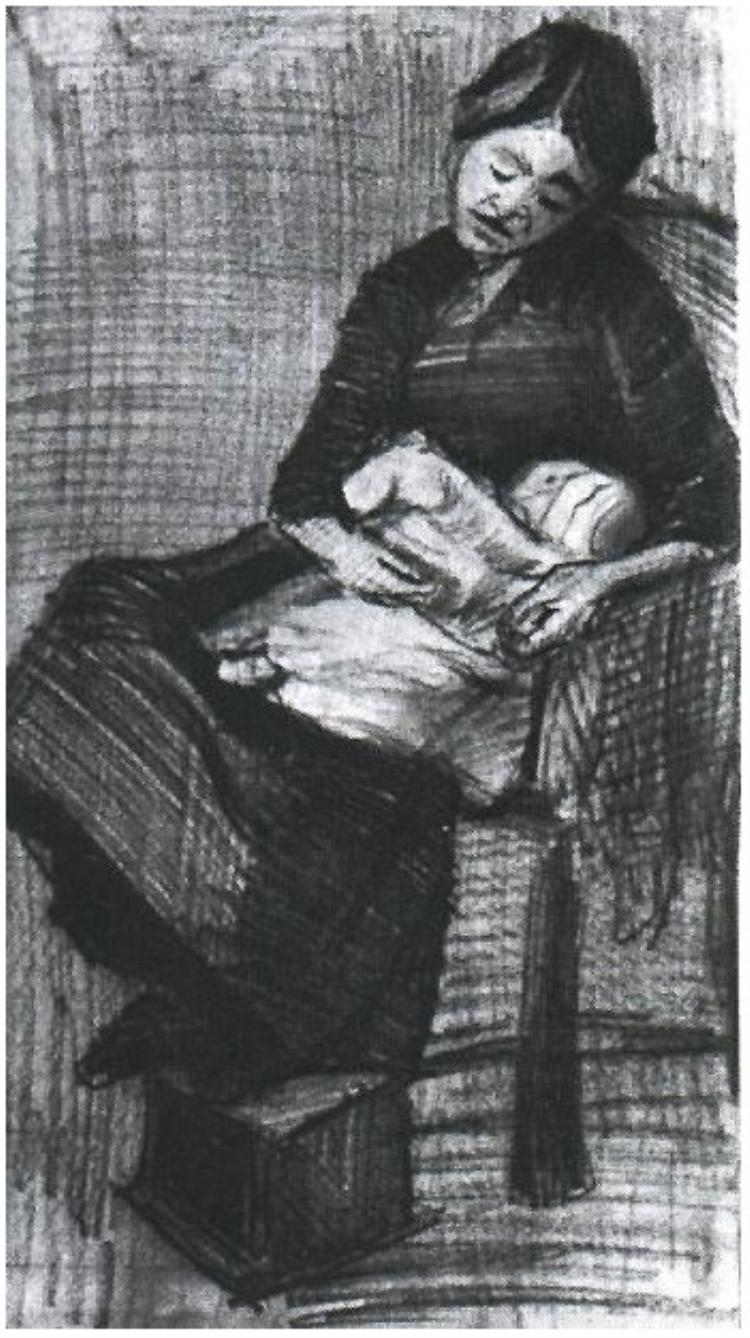
Sien Nursing Baby, drawing, 1882, Kröller-Müller Museum, Otterlo, The Netherlands (F1063)

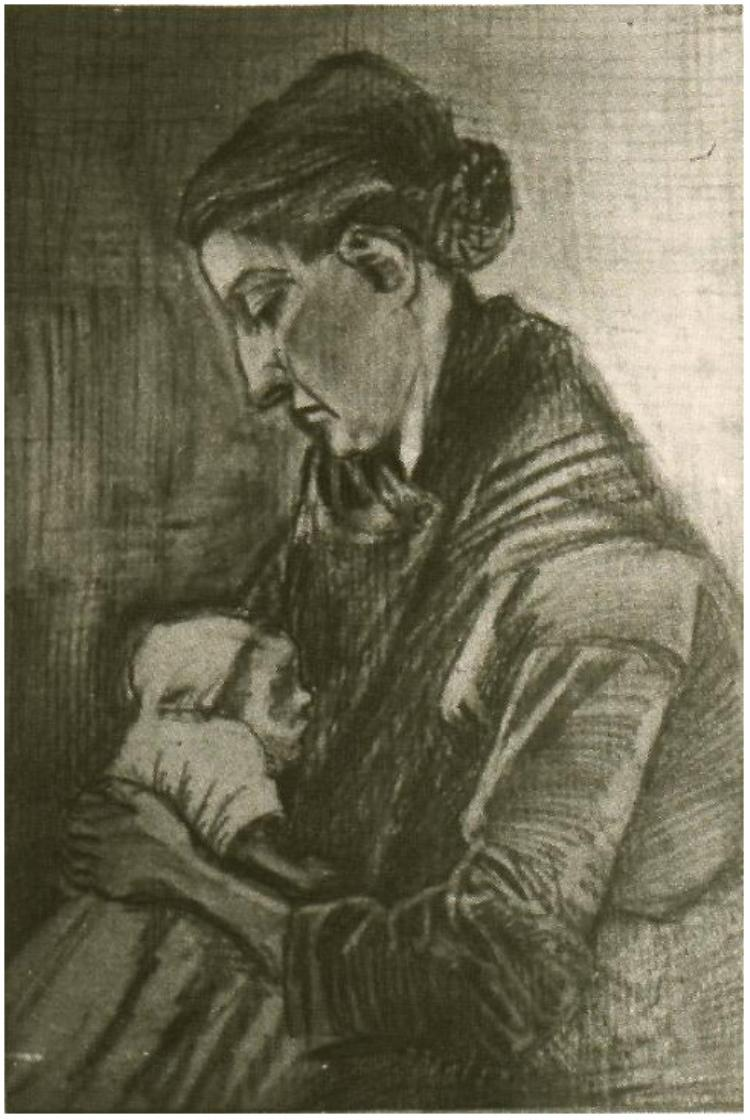
Sien Nursing Baby, drawing, 1882, Private collection (F1064)

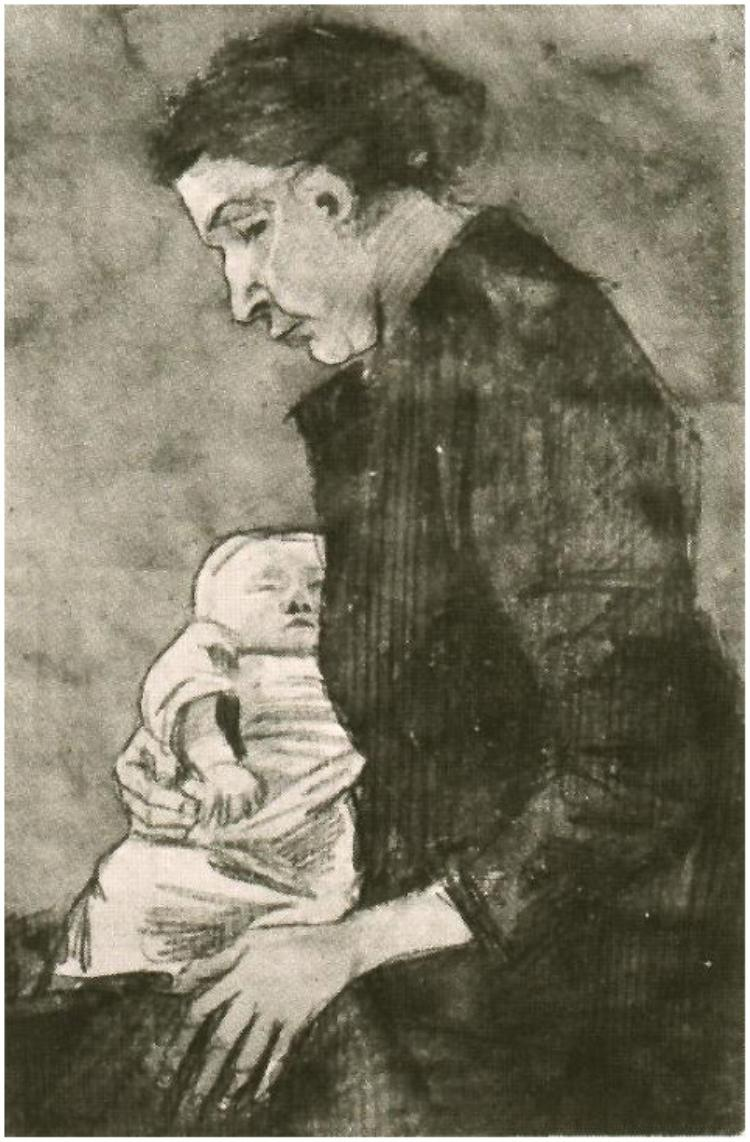
Sien Nursing Baby, Half-Figure, drawing, 1882, Private collection, (F1065)

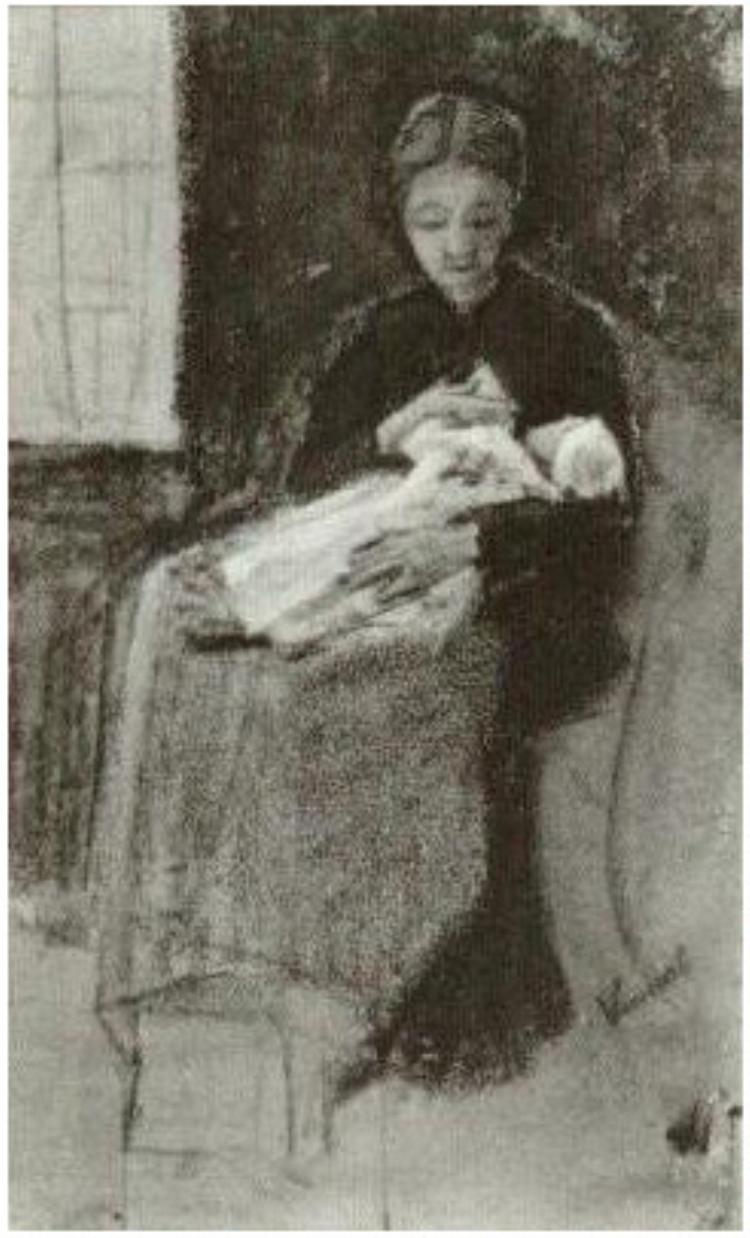
Sien Nursing Baby, watercolor, 1882, Private collection (F1068)

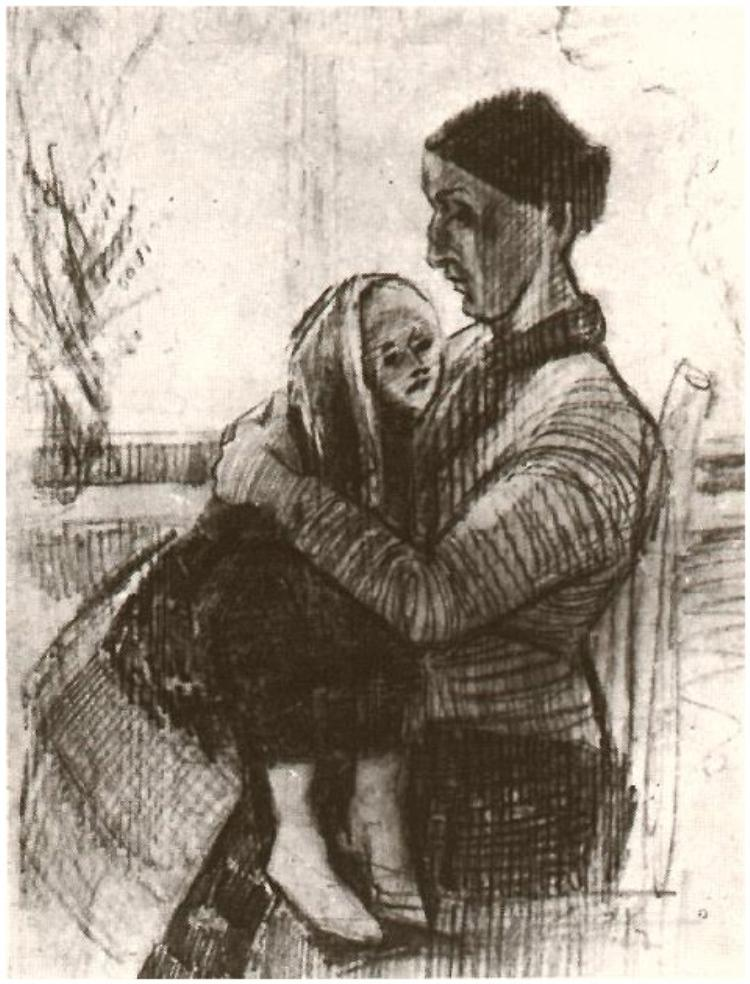
Sien with Child on her Lap, drawing, 1882, Kröller-Müller Museum, Otterlo, The Netherlands (F1071)

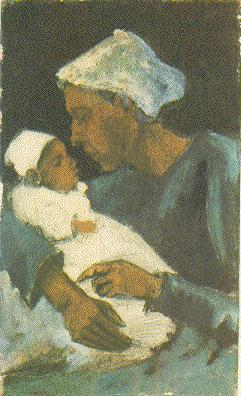
Woman (Sien) with Baby on her Lap, Half-Figure, September 1882 (F1061)

=== Sien's daughter, Mariya ===
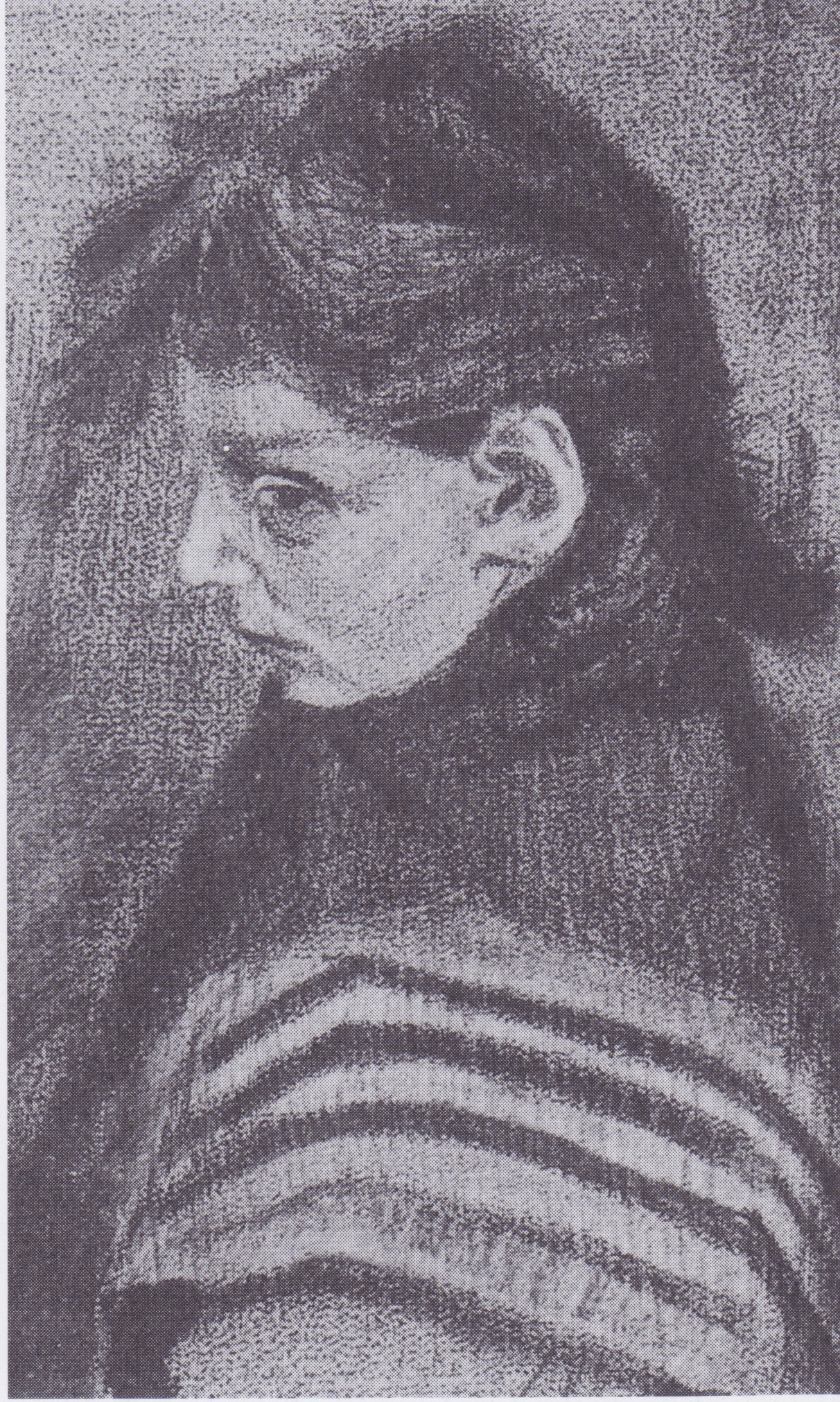
Sien's daughter with scarf, January 1883, Kröller-Müller Museum, Otterlo, Netherlands (F1007)

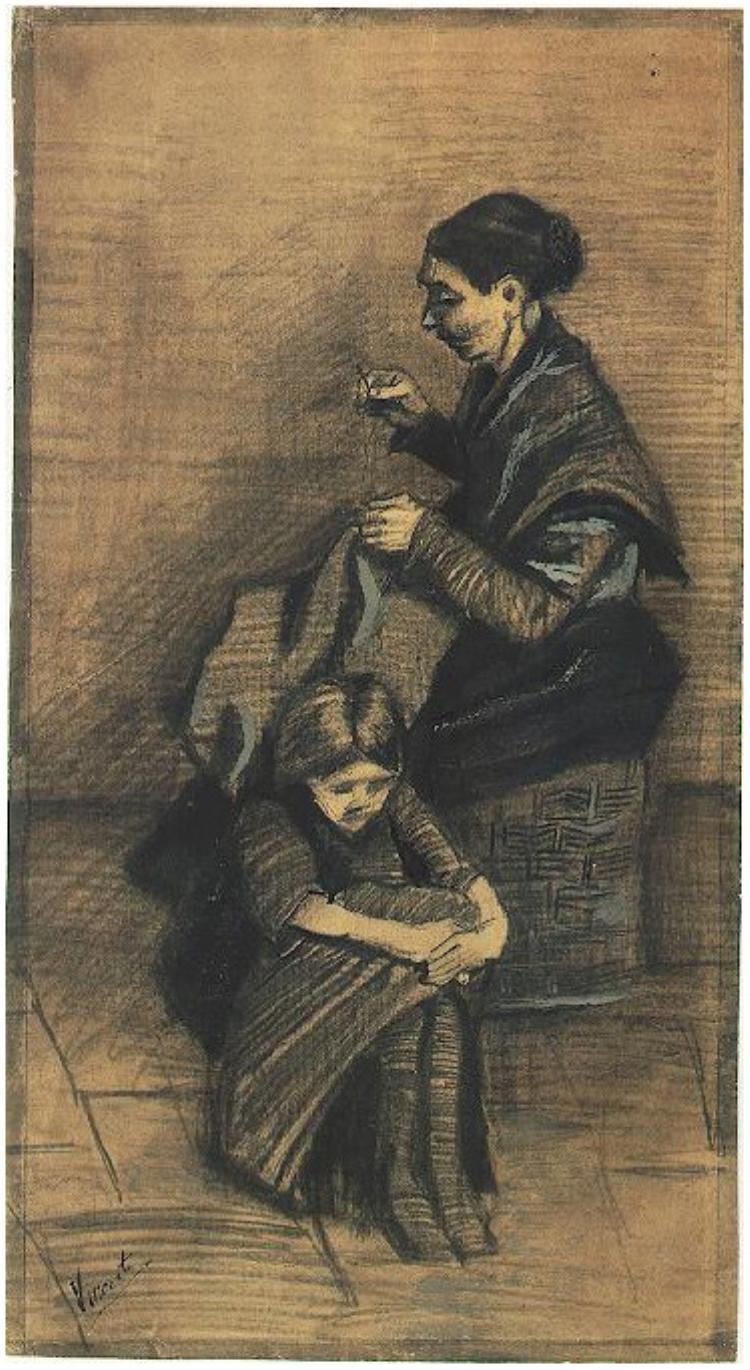
Sien, Sitting on a Basket, with a Girl, 1883, Natural black, chalk, pen and brush in brown-black ink (possibly black originally), black watercolour, opaque grey watercolour, grey (?) wash, scratched, on wove paper, Van Gogh Museum, Amsterdam (F1072, JH341)

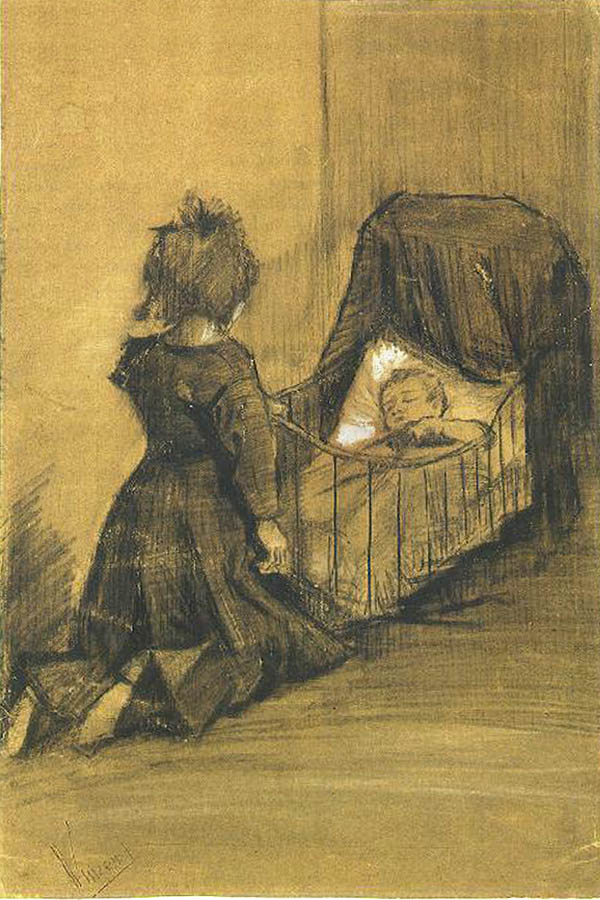
Girl Kneeling by a Cradle, (Mariya and Willem), March 1883, drawing (pencil, charcoal, heightened with white), Van Gogh Museum, Amsterdam (F1024)

=== Sien's mother ===
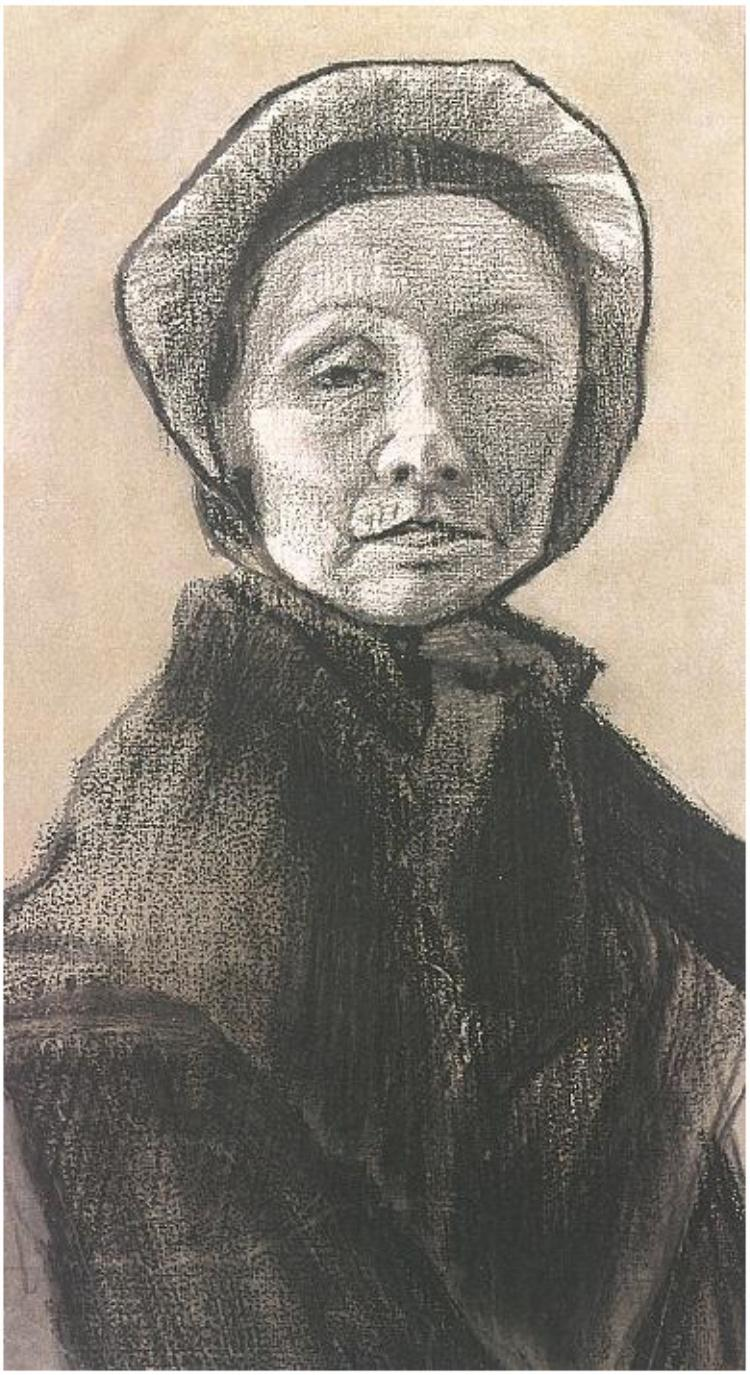
Woman with Dark Cap (Sien's Mother), 1882 (F1057)

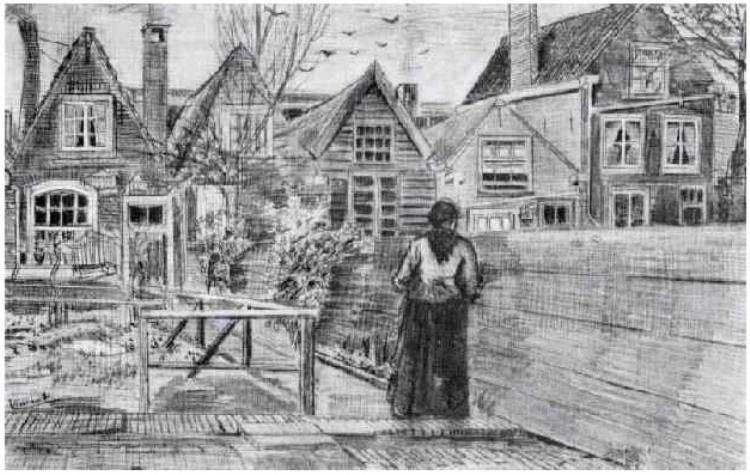
Sien's Mother's House, drawing, 1882, Private collection, (F941)

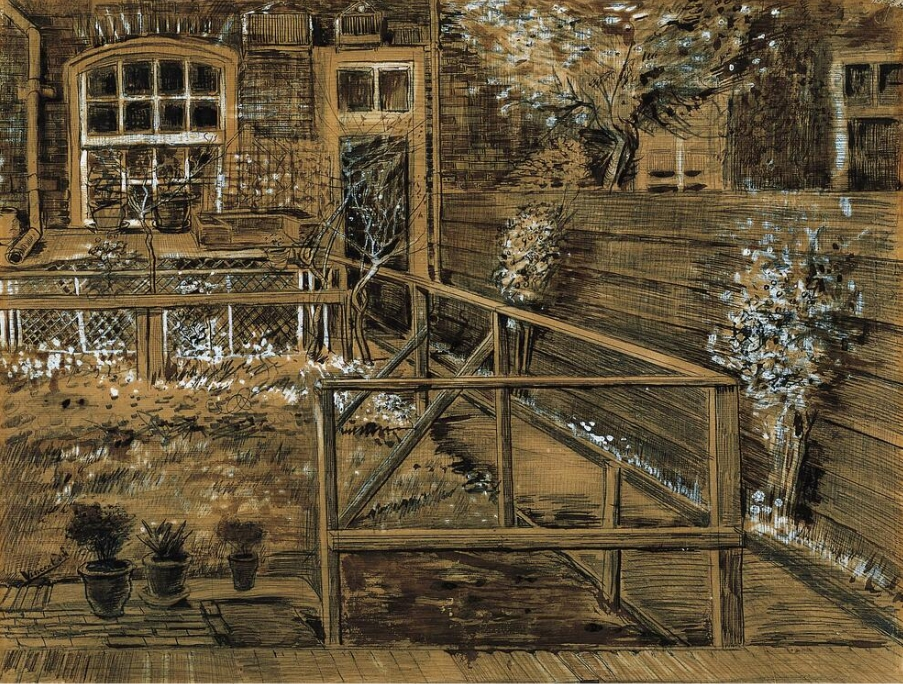
Sien's Mother's House, Closer View, drawing, 1882, Norton Simon Museum, Pasadena, California (F942)

== Public soup kitchen ==
Quite poor, Sien's family often relied upon the public soup kitchen for food.

Hulsker called the signed drawing The Public Soup Kitchen (F1020a below) important and attractive. Van Gogh and his contemporary George Hendrik Breitner had sketched together at a soup kitchen in the Geest (it is not known which of the several possibilities it was). After going to the trouble and expense of installing shutters in his windows to adjust the light and to recreate the scene itself in his studio, Van Gogh was able to study his models at leisure. In this way he was able to introduce more chiaroscuro (light and dark) in his drawing, which he executed with the natural ('mountain') chalk that Theo had sent him and whose properties he lauds in his letters. All the models are from Sien's family: her mother and baby on the left, her sister, back turned, and her daughter, hair cropped as a precaution against lice, in the center, with Sien herself, superbly executed in profile, on the right. The watercolor F1020b (below) is much less successful as Van Gogh himself acknowledged, blaming the paper in part for not being right for the job.

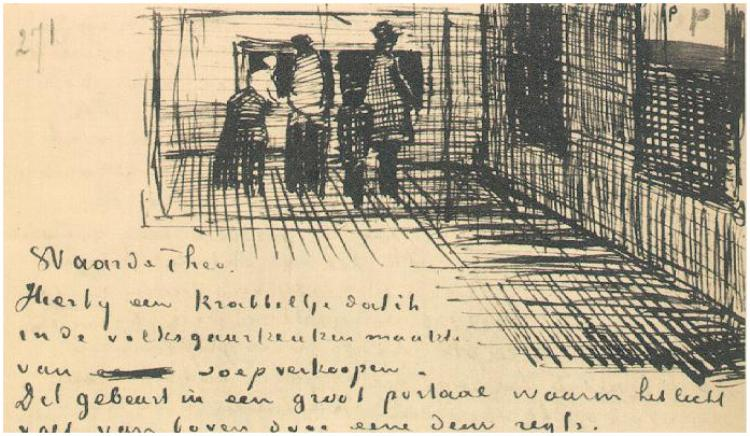
The Public Soup Kitchen, letter sketch, 1883, Van Gogh Museum, Amsterdam (F271)

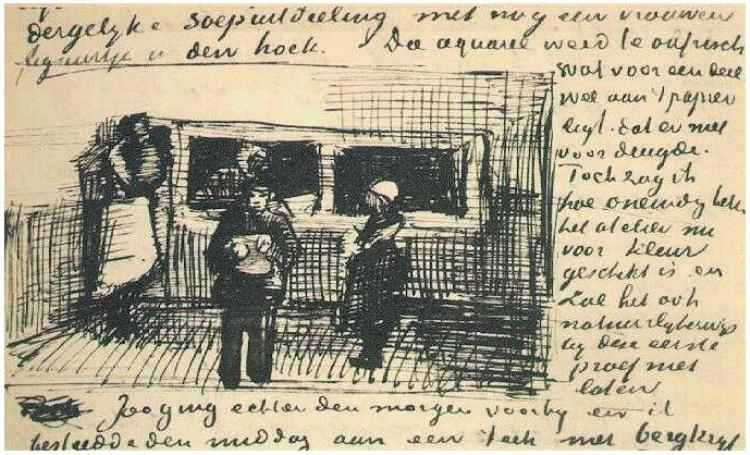
The Public Soup Kitchen, letter sketch, 1883, Van Gogh Museum, Amsterdam (F272)

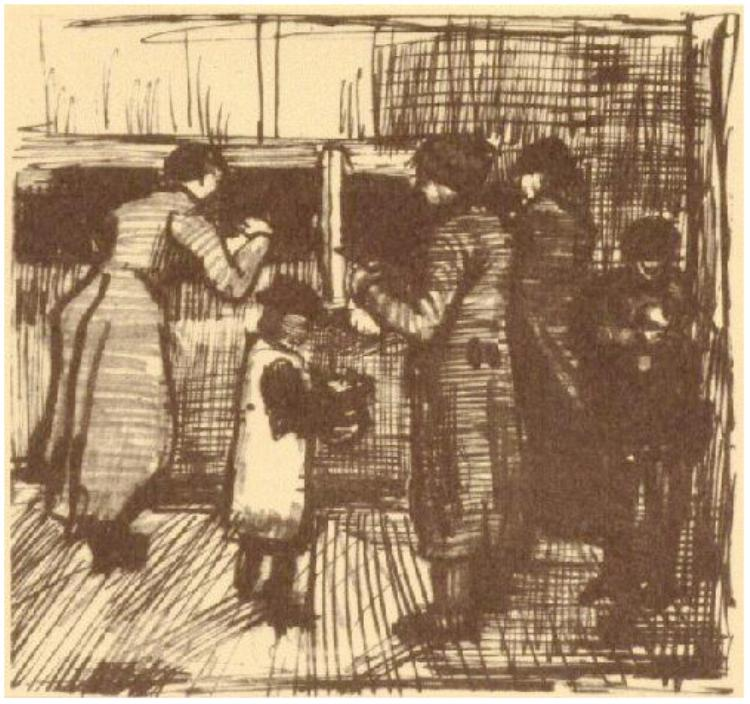
The Public Soup Kitchen, drawing, 1883, Van Gogh Museum, Amsterdam (F1020)

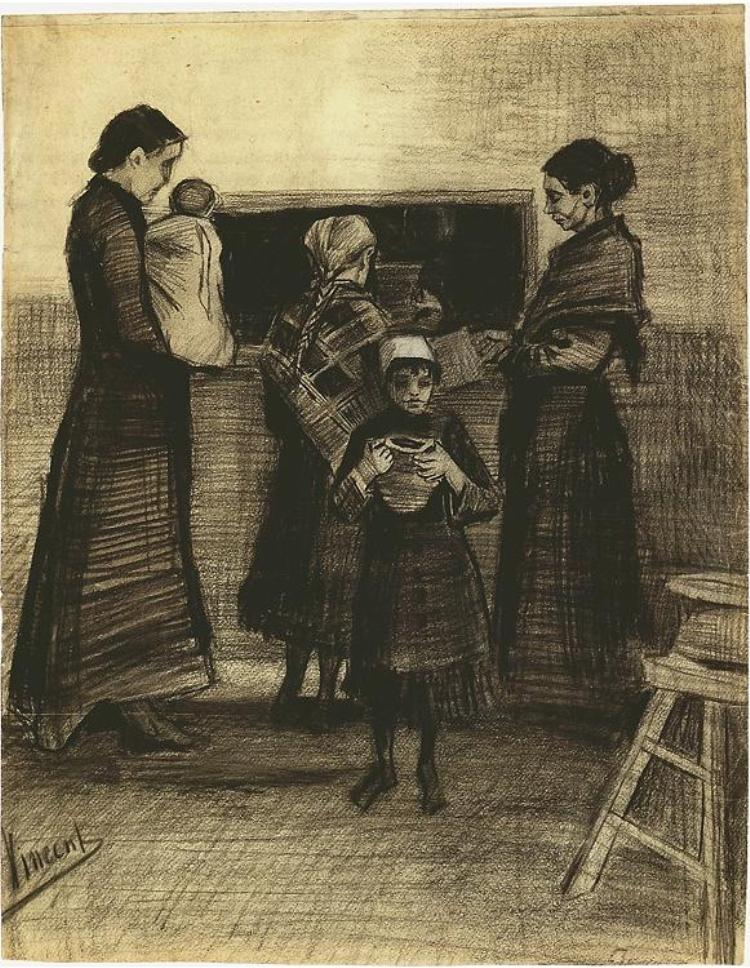
Soup Distribution in a Public Soup Kitchen, drawing, 1883, Van Gogh Museum, Amsterdam (F1020a)

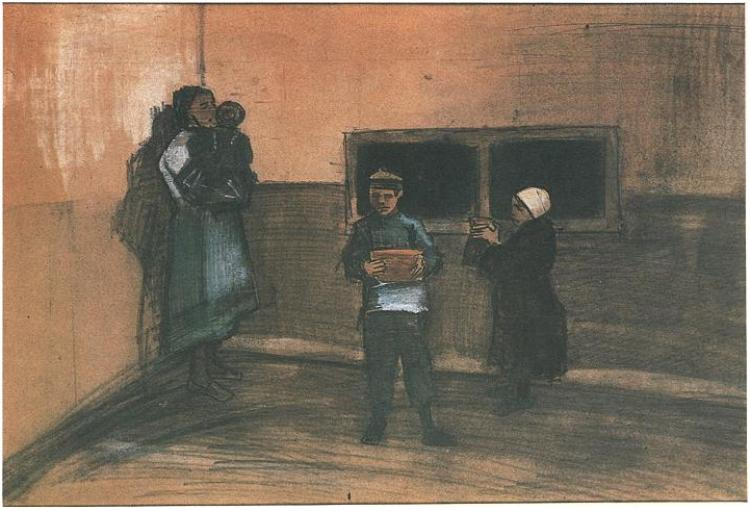
The Public Soup Kitchen, watercolor, 1883, Private collection (F1020b)

== In popular media ==
In 1956 biopic about Van Gogh, Lust for Life, Christina (played by Pamela Brown) is a poor single mother and occasional prostitute who lives with Vincent.

The 2020 historical novel Sien van Gogh by Yves Saerens gives Sien a voice of her own. This tale depicts her as a raw yet vulnerable and endearing woman, living at the margin of late-19th-century society.

== See also ==
- List of works by Vincent van Gogh

== Bibliography ==
- Hulsker, Jan. The Complete Van Gogh. Oxford: Phaidon, 1980. ISBN 0-7148-2028-8
- Naifeh, Steven; Smith, Gregory White. Van Gogh: The Life. Profile Books, 2011. ISBN 978-1-84668-010-6
- Pomerans, Arnold. The Letters of Vincent van Gogh. Penguin Classics, 2003. ISBN 978-0-14-044674-6
- Sweetman, David. The Love of Many Things: A Life of Vincent van Gogh. Hodder & Stoughton Ltd., 1990. ISBN 978-0-340-50372-0
- Zemel, C (1997). Van Gogh's Progress: Utopia, Modernity, and Late-Nineteenth-Century Art. Berkeley: University of California Press. ISBN 0-520-08849-2.
