= Sorrow (Van Gogh) =

Drawing by Vincent van Gogh

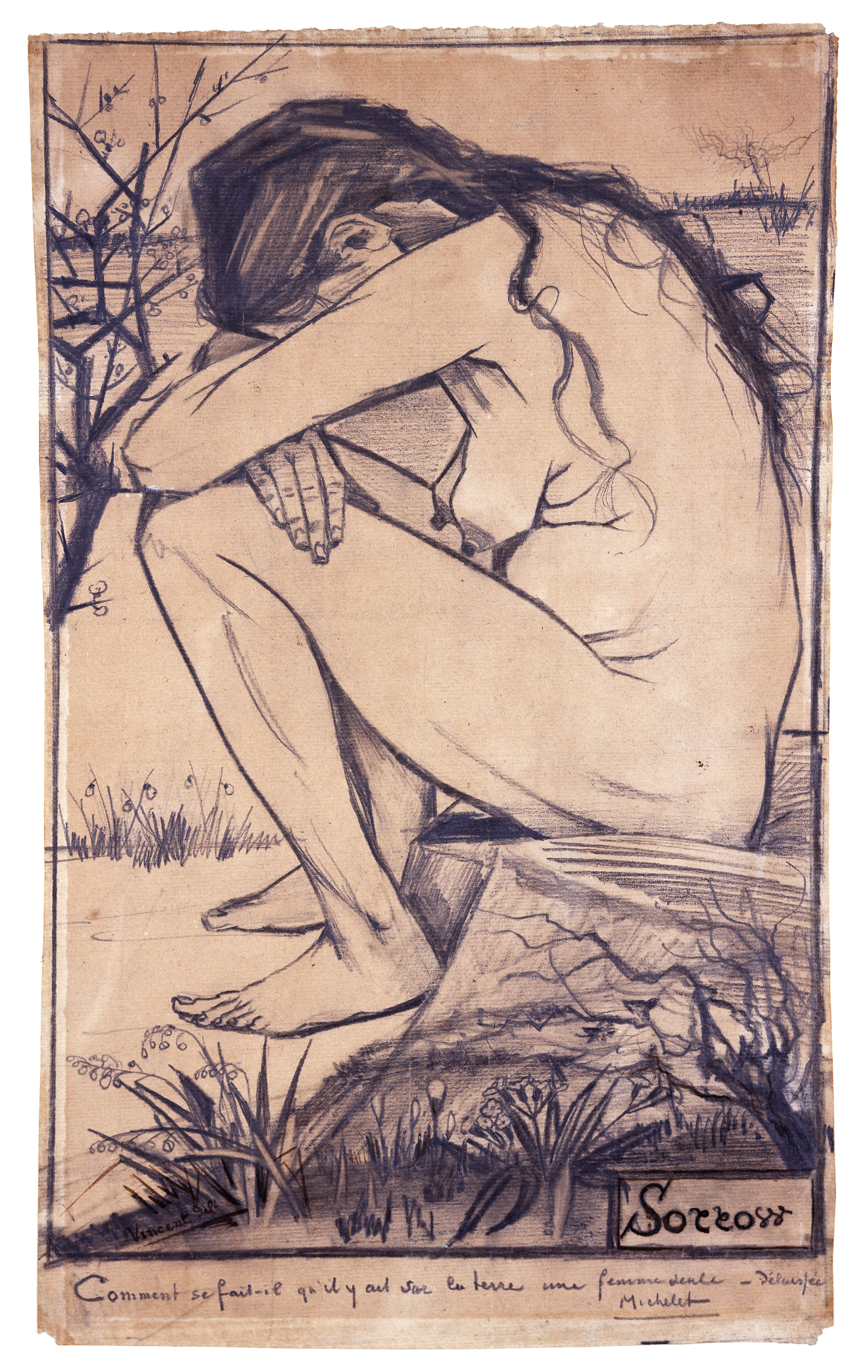
- Artist: Vincent van Gogh
- Year: 1882
- Catalogue: F929a
- Type: Drawing
- Medium: Pencil, pen and ink on paper
- Subject: Nude
- Dimensions: 44.5 cm × 27.0 cm (17.5 in × 10.6 in)
- Condition: Good
- Location: The New Art Gallery Walsall; England
- Accession: 1973.128.GR

Sorrow is a drawing by Vincent van Gogh, produced in 1882.

The work, created two years after Van Gogh had decided to become an artist, depicts 32-year-old pregnant woman Clasina Maria Hoornik, familiarly known as Sien. The drawing is part of the Garman Ryan Collection held at The New Art Gallery Walsall. Previously, it was in the private collection of artist Sally Ryan, who had the work hung in her permanent suite at the Dorchester Hotel in London.

The drawing is one of a series using Sien Hoornik as model. It is mentioned in a number of letters by Van Gogh, and he appears to have thought highly of it, considering it an important work and describing the drawing as "the best figure I've drawn". In a letter from July 1882, Van Gogh states; I want to make drawings that touch some people. Sorrow is a small beginning [...] there is at least something directly from my own heart. The piece is numbered as F929a in the catalogue raisonné by Jacob Baart de la Faille.

== Relationship with Sien ==
Van Gogh is reported to have encountered Sien Hoornik wandering the streets of The Hague with her five-year-old daughter Maria Wilhelmina in January 1882. She was destitute and pregnant, with addictions to alcohol and tobacco and reportedly working as a prostitute. Van Gogh cared for her for around a year between 1882 and 1883, reportedly out of pity and a sense of duty. From Hoornik's perspective their relationship is not reported to have been anything more than a convenient solution to a difficult situation. Van Gogh was, however, reported at one stage to have been planning to marry her. He provided shelter and in return Hoornik modelled for him.

In July 1882, Hoornik gave birth to a son, Willem, at the Maternity Hospital in Leiden. After the birth, she and Van Gogh moved into an apartment with a studio. This was reportedly a happy period for Van Gogh but by early 1883 Hoornik had started drinking again and returned to prostitution. The shared apartment became squalid, and the relationship between them deteriorated. Van Gogh found it increasingly difficult to support Hoornik and her children, in September 1883 they parted and Van Gogh left to further his career. In 1904, Clasina Maria Hoornik drowned herself in the Schelde River.

== Symbolism ==
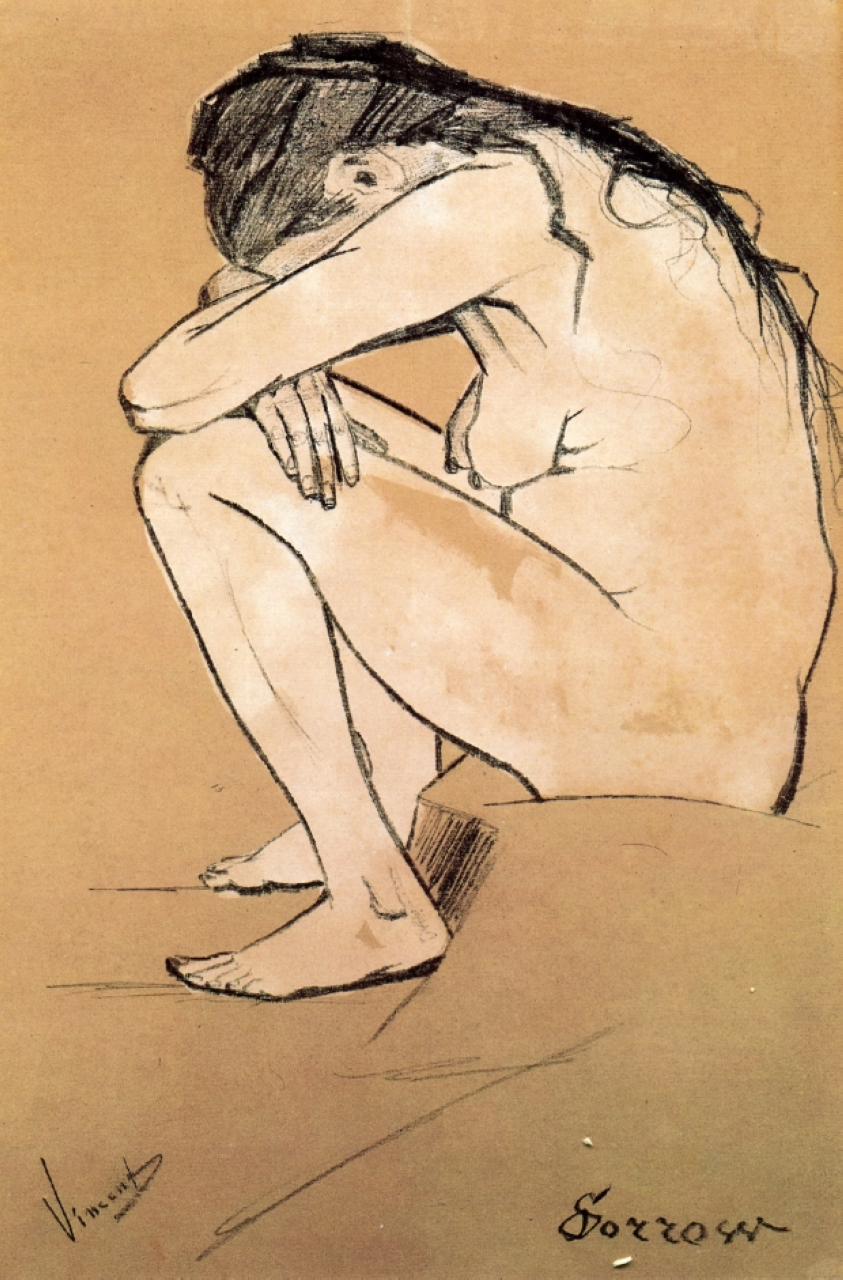
The lost version (F929)

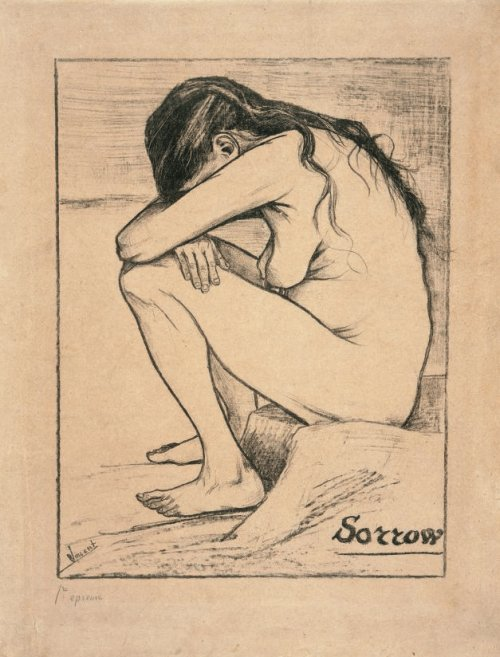
A print (F 1655, JH 259)

Sorrow was probably produced in the spring of 1882, between the encounter with Hoornik in January and the birth of her son in July. The drawing was mentioned in a letter to Van Gogh's brother Theo dated 10 April 1882. This dating is supported by the depiction of spring flowers in the foreground. Although the overall feel of the image has been described as bleak, the presence of spring flowers hints at the possibility of redemption. Van Gogh depicts Sien Hoornik as a woman scarred by life, and saw parallels to his own drawings of age-old trees ravaged by nature, such as The Roots in Sandy Ground (Les racines) 1882: "I wanted to express something of life's struggle, both in that white slender female figure and in those gnarled black roots with their knots."

The drawing is inscribed with the phrase "Comment se fait-il qu'il y ait sur la terre une femme seule, délaissée?", which translates to "How can there be on earth a woman alone, abandoned?", a quotation from contemporary social historian Jules Michelet's book La Femme. The phrase provides a key to the themes of some of Van Gogh's early works, and his belief in poverty being the root cause of things such as prostitution.

== Alternative versions ==
There were reportedly four versions of Sorrow from around early to mid April 1882, the original drawing and two other versions which were made when Van Gogh realised the original had been pressed through onto two sheets of underlying paper, which he was able to work up afterwards. Ten days after production of the original he drew another larger version of the same subject, now only two versions remain. The larger version is mentioned by Van Gogh in a letter to Theo dated 1 May 1882. He writes:

I've now finished two larger drawings. First of all Sorrow, but in a larger format, the figure alone without surroundings. But the pose has been altered somewhat, the hair doesn't hang down the back but to the front, part of it in a plait. This brings the shoulder, the neck, and back into view. And the figure has been drawn with more care.

The location of this alternative version is currently unknown, and it may no longer exist.

Another of the drawings mentioned as being sent to his brother in a letter on 10 April 1882 is considered lost.

Print impressions of versions of Sorrow are in the collection of the Van Gogh Museum, Amsterdam (which has two copies) and the Museum of Modern Art, New York. The latter's copy was printed by J. Smulders & Cie. of The Hague.

== See also ==
- List of works by Vincent van Gogh
