= List of drawings by Vincent van Gogh =

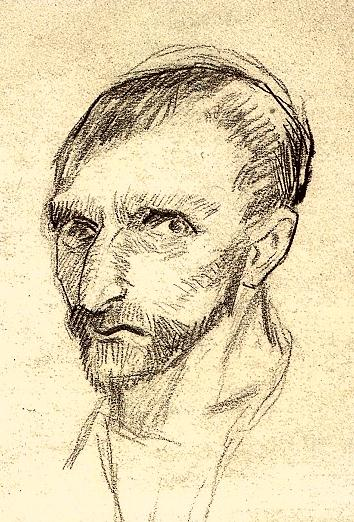
Self Portrait, Paris 1887, Van Gogh Museum

List of drawings by Vincent van Gogh is an incomplete collection of drawings by the Dutch artist Vincent van Gogh (1853–1890) that form an important part of his complete body of work. The listing is ordered by year and then by catalogue number. While more accurate dating of Van Gogh's work is often difficult. As a general rule the numbering from Jan Hulsker's catalogue is more precise chronologically

== Drawings ==
=== London-Belgium-Etten ===
Image	Title	Date	Current location	Created in	Catalogue No.
	87 Hackford Road	1873 or 74	Private collection	London	
	Coal Shoveler	July–August 1879	Kröller-Müller Museum, Otterlo	Cuesmes	F 827
	Miners	September 1880	Kröller-Müller Museum, Otterlo	Cuesmes	F 831
	The Diggers (after Millet)	October 1880	Musée des Beaux Arts Mons	Brussels	F 828
	The Diggers (after Millet)	October 1880	Kröller-Müller Museum, Otterlo	Brussels	F 829
	The Angelus (after Millet)	October 1880	Kröller-Müller Museum, Otterlo	Brussels	F 834
	Before the Hearth	January 1881	Van Gogh Museum, Amsterdam	Brussels	JH Juv. 16
	Miners' Women Carrying Sacks (The Bearers of the Burden)	April 1881	Kröller-Müller Museum, Otterlo	Brussels	F 832
	Sower (after Millet)	April 1881	Van Gogh Museum, Amsterdam	Etten	F 830; JH 1
	Barn with Moss Grown Roof	April–May 1881	Museum Boijmans-van Beuningen, Rotterdam	Etten	F 842; JH 5
	Boy with Cap and Clogs	April–June 1881	Van Gogh Museum, Amsterdam	Etten	F 1681; JH 202
	Landscape with Windmill	May 1881	Kröller-Müller Museum, Otterlo	Etten	F 843; JH 6
	Sketch of a Landscape with Factories	May 1881	St Louis Art Museum	Etten	F 874r
	Marsh with Water Lilies	June 1881	Private collection	Etten	F 845; JH 7
	Marsh	June 1881	National Gallery of Canada, Ottawa	Etten	F 846; JH 8
	Landscape with Trees	June 1881	Museum Boijmans Van Beuningen, Rotterdam	Etten	F 902a JH 10
	Portrait possibly of Willemien van Gogh	June 1881	Kröller-Müller Museum, Otterlo	Etten	F 849; JH 11
	Portrait of Vincent van Gogh, the Artist's Grandfather	July 1881	Van Gogh Museum, Amsterdam	Etten	F 876; JH 14
	Sower	September 1881	Kröller-Müller Museum, Otterlo	Etten	F 856; JH 17
	Sower	September 1881	Private collection	Etten	F 858; JH 18
	Sower with Basket	September 1881	Van Gogh Museum, Amsterdam	Etten	F 1675; JH 26
	Sower with Hand in Sack	September 1881	Kröller-Müller Museum, Otterlo	Etten	F 862; JH 31
	Sower with Hand in Sack	September 1881	Private collection	Etten	F 857; JH 32
	Sower	September 1881	Van Gogh Museum, Amsterdam	Etten	JH 44
	Small House on a Road with Pollard Willows	October 1881	Kröller-Müller Museum, Otterlo	Etten	F 900; JH 47
	Road with Pollard Willows and Man with Broom	October 1881	Metropolitan Museum of Art, New York	Etten	F 1678; JH 48
	Kneeling Man, Planting	November 1881	Kröller-Müller Museum, Otterlo	Etten	F 879; JH 62
	Farmer Sitting at the Fireplace	November 1881	Kröller-Müller Museum, Otterlo	Etten	F 1868; JH 80

=== The Hague-Drenthe ===
Image	Title	Date	Current location	Created in	Catalogue No.
	Sien with Umbrella and Prayer Book	February 1882	Private collectiom	The Hague	F 1052; JH 101
	Sien under Umbrella with Girl	February 1882	Unknown	The Hague	F 1048; JH 102
	Standing Woman, Half Length	February 1882	Private collection	The Hague	F 840; JH 103
	Sien with Child on her Lap	February 1882	Kröller-Müller Museum, Otterlo	The Hague	F 1071; JH 104
	Bending Woman	February 1882	Private collection	The Hague	F 899; JH 105
	Old Street (The Paddemoes)	March 1882	Kröller-Müller Museum Otterlo	The Hague	F 918; JH 111
	Bakery	March 1882	Kunstmuseum Den Haag, The Hague	The Hague	F 914; JH 112
	Scheveningen Road	March 1882	Private collection	The Hague	F 920; JH 113
	Sand Diggers	March 1882	Unknown	The Hague	F 922; JH 114
	Bridge near the Schenkweg	March 1882	Private collection	The Hague	F 917; JH 115
	Factory	March 1882	Staatliche Kunsthalle Karlsruhe	The Hague	F 925; JH 117
	Gasworks	March 1882	Van Gogh Museum, Amsterdam	The Hague	F 924; JH 118
	Backyards	March 1882	Private collection	The Hague	F 939a JH 120
	Bridge and Houses on the Corner of Herengracht-Prinsessegracht, The Hague	March 1882	Van Gogh Museum, Amsterdam	The Hague	F 1679; JH 121
	Staatsspoor Station	March 1882	Kunstmuseum Den Haag	The Hague	F 919; JH 123
	Country Road	March–April 1882	Van Gogh Museum, Amsterdam	The Hague	F 1089; JH 124
	Nursery on Schenkweg	April 1882	Rijksmuseum, Amsterdam	The Hague	F 923; JH 125
	Sorrow	April 1882	Private collection	The Hague	F 929; JH 129
	Sorrow	April 1882	The New Art Gallery Walsall	The Hague	F 929a JH 130
	Torn-Up Street with Diggers	April 1882	Kupferstichkabinett Berlin	The Hague	F 930a JH 131
	Saw Mill	April 1882	Private collection	The Hague	F 301; JH 136
	Blacksmith Shop	April 1882	Kröller-Müller Museum Otterlo	The Hague	F 1082; JH 137
	Nursery on Schenkweg	April 1882	Metropolitan Museum of Art, New York	The Hague	F 930; JH 138
	Sien with a Cigar, Sitting on the Floor beside the Fireplace	April 1882	Kröller-Müller Museum Otterlo	The Hague	F 898; JH 141
	Bent Figure of a Woman (Sien?)	May 1882	Kröller-Müller Museum Otterlo	The Hague	F 935; JH 143
	Bent Figure of a Woman	May 1882	Kröller-Müller Museum Otterlo	The Hague	F 937; JH 144
	Sien's Mother's House	May 1882	Private collection	The Hague	F 941; JH 146
	Sien's Mother's House, Closer View	May 1882	Norton Simon Museum, Pasadena	The Hague	F 942; JH 147
	Sien Pregnant, Walking with Older Woman	May 1882	Private collection	The Hague	F 988a JH 148
	Carpenter's Yard and Laundry	May 1882	Kröller-Müller Museum, Otterlo	The Hague	F 939; JH 150
	Carpenter's Yard and Laundry	June 1882	Private collection	The Hague	F 944; JH 153
	Cradle	July 1882	Van Gogh Museum, Amsterdam	The Hague	JH 155
	Studies of Donkey Carts	September 1882	Kröller-Müller Museum, Otterlo	The Hague	F 952v JH 193
	Bench with Four Persons	September 1882	Kröller-Müller Museum, Otterlo	The Hague	F 952r JH 194
	Bench in a Wood	September 1882	Unknown	The Hague	F 928; JH 199
	Carpenter	September 1882	Private collection	The Hague	F 1043; JH 206
	Carpenter Seen from the Back	September 1882	Private collection	The Hague	F 1042; JH 207
	A Carpenter with Apron	September 1882	Private collection	The Hague	F 1044; JH 208
	Old Man with a Stick	September 1882	Van Gogh Museum, Amsterdam	The Hague	F 962; JH 212
	Sien Nursing Baby, Half-Figure	September 1882	Kröller-Müller Museum, Otterlo	The Hague	F 1062; JH 216
	Sien Nursing Baby, Half-Figure	September 1882	Private collection	The Hague	F 1065; JH 217
	Sien Nursing Baby	September 1882	Kröller-Müller Museum, Otterlo	The Hague	F 1063; JH 218
	Sien Nursing Baby	September 1882	Private collection	The Hague	F 1064; JH 221
	Man and Woman Seen from the Back	September 1882	Van Gogh Museum, Amsterdam	The Hague	F 991; JH 233
	Boy with Spade	October 1882	Unknown	The Hague	F 986; JH 231
	Worn Out	November 1882	Van Gogh Museum, Amsterdam	The Hague	F 997; JH 267
	Old Man with his Head in his Hands, Half-Figure	24 November 1882	Kröller-Müller Museum, Otterlo	The Hague	F 998; JH 269
	The Sower	December 1882	Private collection	The Hague	F 852; JH 275
	The Sower	December 1882	Unknown	The Hague	F 1000; JH 276
	The Sower	December 1882	Unknown	The Hague	F 999; JH 277
	Prayer Before the Meal	December 1882	Private collection	The Hague	F 1002; JH 281
	Orphan Man, Wearing a Blouse, with Broom and Pipe	December 1882	Private collection	The Hague	F 996; JH 283
	Old Man with a Top Hat	December 1882	Van Gogh Museum, Amsterdam	The Hague	F 985; JH 289
	Orphan Man with Top Hat	December 1882	Worcester Art Museum	The Hague	F 954; JH 287
	Head of a Woman (probably Sien)	December–January 1882–83	Van Gogh Museum, Amsterdam	The Hague	F 931; JH 291
	Baby	Winter 1882–83	Van Gogh Museum, Amsterdam	The Hague	F 912; JH 318
	Landscape with Woman Walking	1883	Private collection	The Hague	JH Add. 22
	Baby	January 1883	Van Gogh Museum, Amsterdam	The Hague	F 911r JH 319
	Girl with Shawl, Half-Figure	January 1883	Kröller-Müller Museum, Otterlo	The Hague	F 1007; JH 299
	Fisherman with Sou'wester, Head	January 1883	Kröller-Müller Museum, Otterlo	The Hague	F 1011; JH 309
	Stooping Woman with Net	January 1883	Van Gogh Museum, Amsterdam	The Hague	F 911v JH 320
	Fisherman in Jacket with Upturned Collar	February 1883	Private collection	The Hague	F 1049; JH 312
	Woman Sitting on a Basket with Head in Hands	March 1883	Art Institute of Chicago	The Hague	F 1069; JH 325
	Woman Sitting on a Basket with Head in Hands	March 1883	Kröller-Müller Museum, Otterlo	The Hague	F 1060; JH 326
	Soup Distribution in a Public Soup Kitchen	March 1883	Van Gogh Museum, Amsterdam	The Hague	F 1020a JH 330
	The Public Soup Kitchen	March 1883	Van Gogh Museum	The Hague	F 1020; JH 333
	Baby Crawling	March 1883	Private collection	The Hague	F 1872; JH 334
	Girl Kneeling by a Cradle	March 1883	Van Gogh Museum	The Hague	F 1024; JH 336
	Workman with Spade, Sitting near the Window	March 1883	Arkansas Arts Center, Little Rock	The Hague	F 964a JH 340
	Woman Sewing, with a Girl	March 1883	Van Gogh Museum, Amsterdam	The Hague	F 1072; JH 341
	Snowy Yard	March 1883	Private collection	The Hague	F 1023; JH 343
	Sien, Sewing, Half-Figure	March 1883	Museum Boijmans Van Beuningen, Rotterdam	The Hague	F 1025; JH 346
	Sien, Sewing, Half-Figure	March 1883	Kröller-Müller Museum, Otterlo	The Hague	F 1026; JH 347
	Man Praying	April 1883	Private collection	The Hague	F 1027; JH 354
	Sien, Peeling Potatoes	April 1883	Kunstmuseum Den Haag, The Hague	The Hague	F 1053a JH 358
	Sand Diggers in Dekkersduin near The Hague	June 1883	Private collection	The Hague	F 1029; JH 366
	Sand Diggers in Dekkersduin near The Hague	June 1883	Van Gogh Museum, Amsterdam	The Hague	F 1028; JH 367
	Potato Grubbers, Four Figures	June 1883	Unknown	The Hague	F 1034; JH 372
	The Sower	July 1883	Unknown	The Hague	F 1035; JH 374
	Landscape in Drente	September–October 1883	Van Gogh Museum, Amsterdam	Drenthe	F 1104; JH 424
	A Sheet with Sketches	October 1883	Van Gogh Museum, Amsterdam	Drenthe	JH 405
	Landscape with Bog-Oak Trunks	October 1883	Museum of Fine Arts, Boston	Drenthe	F 1095; JH 406
	Landscape with a Little Bridge	October 1883	Kröller-Müller Museum, Otterlo	Drenthe	F 1347; JH 408
	Shepherd with Flock near a Little Church at Zweeloo	November 1883	Private collection	Drenthe	F 877; JH 423

=== Nuenen-Antwerp ===
Image	Title	Date	Current location	Created in	Catalogue No.
	Snowy Landscape with the Old Tower	December 1883	Private collection	Nuenen	F 1687; JH 428
	Snowy Landscape with Stooping Woman	December 1883	Kröller-Müller Museum, Otterlo	Nuenen	F 1232; JH 429
	Churchyard in Winter	December 1883	Van Gogh Museum, Amsterdam	Nuenen	F 1236r JH 432
	Churchyard in Winter	December 1883	Van Gogh Museum, Amsterdam	Nuenen	F 1237; JH 433
	Landscape with a Church	December 1883	Van Gogh Museum, Amsterdam	Nuenen	F 1238; JH 435
	Landscape with a Church	December 1883	Van Gogh Museum, Amsterdam	Nuenen	F 1236v JH 436
	Churchyard in the Rain	December 1883	Albertina, Vienna	Nuenen	F 1399; JH 1031
	Churchyard in the Rain	December 1883	Kröller-Müller Museum, Otterlo	Nuenen	F 1399a JH 1032
	Interior with Weaver Facing Right	December 1883	Kröller-Müller Museum, Otterlo	Nuenen	F 1109; JH 439
	Weaver Facing Right	January 1884	Van Gogh Museum, Amsterdam	Nuenen	F 1120; JH 443
	Church at Nuenen with one Figure	January 1884	Kröller-Müller Museum, Otterlo	Nuenen	F 1117; JH 446
	Weaver, with a Baby in a Highchair	January–February 1884	Van Gogh Museum, Amsterdam	Nuenen	F 1118; JH 452
	Weaver	January–August 1884	Van Gogh Museum, Amsterdam	Nuenen	F 1121; JH 453
	Weaver	January 1884	Van Gogh Museum, Amsterdam	Nuenen	F 1122; JH 454
	Weaver	January–August 1884	Van Gogh Museum, Amsterdam	Nuenen	F 1123; JH 455
	Weaver	January–August 1884	Van Gogh Museum, Amsterdam	Nuenen	F 1116; JH 462
	Weaver Facing Left	February 1884	Private collection	Nuenen	F 1124; JH 456
	Behind the Hedge	March 1884	Rijksmuseum, Amsterdam	Nuenen	F 1129; JH 461
	Avenue of Poplars	March 1884	Van Gogh Museum, Amsterdam	Nuenen	F 1239; JH 464
	Parsonage Garden at Neunen in Winter	March 1884	Museum of Fine Arts, Budapest	Nuenen	F 1130; JH 465
	Landscape with Willows and Sun Shining Through the Clouds	March 1884	Art Institute of Chicago	Nuenen	F 1240a JH 467
	The Kingfisher	March 1884	Van Gogh Museum, Amsterdam	Nuenen	F 1135; JH 468
	Pollard Birches	March 1884	Van Gogh Museum, Amsterdam	Nuenen	F 1240; JH 469
	Lane with Trees and One Figure	March 1884	Art Institute of Chicago	Nuenen	F 1241; JH 470
	Vicarage at Nuenen	April 1884	Art Gallery of Ontario, Toronto	Nuenen	F 1343; JH 475
	Weaver with Other Figures in Front of Loom	April–May 1884	Kröller-Müller Museum, Otterlo	Nuenen	F 1111; JH 483
	Parsonage Garden	April 1884	Private collection	Nuenen	F 1133; JH 485
	Weaver Standing in Front of a Loom	May 1884	Kröller-Müller Museum, Otterlo	Nuenen	F 1134; JH 481
	Woman Reeling Yarn	June 1884	Kröller-Müller Museum, Otterlo	Nuenen	F 1137; JH 493
	The Sower	August 1884	Private collection	Nuenen	F 1143; JH 509
	Potato Harvest with Two Figures	August 1884	Private collection	Nuenen	F 1141; JH 510
	Oxcart in the Snow	August 1884	Private collection	Nuenen	F 1144; JH 511
	Ploughman	August 1884	Private collection	Nuenen	F 1142; JH 512
	Lane of Poplars	October 1884	Private collection	Nuenen	F 1246; JH 520
	Peasant Woman, Head	December–January 1884–85	Private collection	Nuenen	F 1193; JH 552
	Silhouette of a Peasant Woman Digging Carrots	December–January 1884–85	Van Gogh Museum, Amsterdam	Nuenen	JH 553
	Silhouette of a Man with a Rake	December–January 1884–85	Van Gogh Museum, Amsterdam	Nuenen	JH 554
	Sower facing Left	December–January 1884–85	Van Gogh Museum, Amsterdam	Nuenen	JH 556
	Peasant Woman, Head	December–January 1884–85	Private collection	Nuenen	F 1174; JH 562
	Head of a Man	December–January 1884–85	Van Gogh Museum, Amsterdam	Nuenen	F 1198; JH 564
	Peasant Woman, Head	December–January 1884–85	Private collection	Nuenen	F 1148; JH 567
	Head of a Woman	December–January 1884–85	Van Gogh Museum, Amsterdam	Nuenen	F 1171; JH 570
	Sketches of Heads	December–January 1884–85	Kröller-Müller Museum, Otterlo	Nuenen	F 1151; JH 576
	Peasant Woman, Head	December–January 1884–85	Kröller-Müller Museum, Otterlo	Nuenen	F 1178; JH 594
	Peasant Woman, Head	December–January 1884–85	Unknown	Nuenen	F 1194a JH 747
	Head of a Woman	December–May 1884–85	Van Gogh Museum, Amsterdam	Nuenen	F 1150r JH 575
	Head of a Woman	December–May 1884–85	Van Gogh Museum, Amsterdam	Nuenen	F 1185; JH 595
	Three Hands	December–May 1884–85	Van Gogh Museum, Amsterdam	Nuenen	F 1164v JH 611
	Three Hands, Two with Knives	December–May 1884–85	Van Gogh Museum, Amsterdam	Nuenen	F 1156r JH 613
	Three Hands	December–May 1884–85	Van Gogh Museum, Amsterdam	Nuenen	F 1164r JH 615
	Three Hands	December–May 1884–85	Van Gogh Museum, Amsterdam	Nuenen	F 1167v JH 623
	Lap with Hands and a Bowl	December–May 1884–85	Van Gogh Museum, Amsterdam	Nuenen	F 1165; JH 624
	Lap with Hands	December–May 1884–85	Van Gogh Museum, Amsterdam	Nuenen	F 1167r JH 625
	Arm	December–May 1884–85	Van Gogh Museum, Amsterdam	Nuenen	F 1160v JH 1004
	Arm	December–May 1884–85	Van Gogh Museum, Amsterdam	Nuenen	F 1160r JH 1005
	Studies of a Dead Sparrow	January 1885	Van Gogh Museum, Amsterdam	Nuenen	F 1360v JH 621
	Study Sheet with Seven Hands	January–February 1885	Van Gogh Museum, Amsterdam	Nuenen	F 1360r JH 619
	Seated Woman	February 1885	Van Gogh Museum, Amsterdam	Nuenen	F 1191; JH 547
	St. Catharina's Church at Eindhoven	February 1885	Van Gogh Museum, Amsterdam	Nuenen	JH 606
	Head of a Woman	February 1885	Van Gogh Museum, Amsterdam	Nuenen	F 1177; JH 609
	Head of a Woman	February 1885	Van Gogh Museum, Amsterdam	Nuenen	F 1170; JH 630
	Building in Eindhoven (The "Weigh House")	February 1885	Van Gogh Museum, Amsterdam	Nuenen	JH 638
	St. Martin's Church at Tongelre	February 1885	Van Gogh Museum, Amsterdam	Nuenen	JH 640
	Peasant Woman, Head	February 1885	Private collection	Nuenen	F 1175; JH 645
	Head of a Woman	February 1885	Van Gogh Museum, Amsterdam	Nuenen	F 1149; JH 647
	Seated Woman	February–May 1885	Van Gogh Museum, Amsterdam	Nuenen	F 1190; JH 676
	Seated Woman	February–May 1885	Van Gogh Museum, Amsterdam	Nuenen	F 1189; JH 677
	Peasant Woman, Head	March 1885	Private collection	Nuenen	F 1181; JH 679
	Peasant Woman Reeling Yarn	March 1885	Private collection	Nuenen	F 1290a JH 699
	Lamp in Front of a Window	March–April 1885	Van Gogh Museum, Amsterdam	Nuenen	F 1158v
	Woman Peeling Potatoes	March–April 1885	Van Gogh Museum, Amsterdam	Nuenen	F 1208; JH 652
	Hand with a Stick, and Four People Sharing a Meal	March–April 1885	Van Gogh Museum, Amsterdam	Nuenen	F 1168r JH 666
	Four People Sharing a Meal	March–April 1885	Van Gogh Museum, Amsterdam	Nuenen	F 1227r JH 672
	Woman Sewing	March–April 1885	Van Gogh Museum, Amsterdam	Nuenen	F 1205; JH 711
	Woman Cutting Bread	March–April 1885	Van Gogh Museum, Amsterdam	Nuenen	F 1219; JH 720
	Clock, Clog with Cutlery and a Spoon Rack	March–April 1885	Van Gogh Museum, Amsterdam	Nuenen	F 1349r JH 731
	Plate with Cutlery and a Kettle	March–April 1885	Van Gogh Museum, Amsterdam	Nuenen	F 1349v JH 732
	Hand with a Pot, the Knob of a Chair and a Hunk of Bread	March–April 1885	Van Gogh Museum, Amsterdam	Nuenen	F 1157; JH 739
	Hand with Bowl and a Cat	March–April 1885	Van Gogh Museum, Amsterdam	Nuenen	F 1229r JH 740
	Three Hands, Two Holding Forks	March–April 1885	Van Gogh Museum, Amsterdam	Nuenen	F 1161r JH 746
	Studies of the Interior of a Cottage, and a Sketch of The Potato Eaters	March–April 1885	Van Gogh Museum, Amsterdam	Nuenen	F 1161v JH 760
	Peasant Man and Woman Planting Potatoes	April 1885	Van Gogh Museum, Amsterdam	Nuenen	F 1225; JH 729
	Kettle Over a Fire, and a Cottage by Night	April 1885	Van Gogh Museum, Amsterdam	Nuenen	F 1153v JH 733
	Five Persons at a Meal	April 1885	Unknown	Nuenen	F 1226; JH 736
	Study of Two Peasants	April 1885	Kröller-Müller Museum, Otterlo	Nuenen	F 1333v JH 752
	Study of Two Peasants	April 1885	Kröller-Müller Museum, Otterlo	Nuenen	F 1333r JH 753
	Study of Three Peasants, One Sitting	April 1885	Kröller-Müller Museum, Otterlo	Nuenen	F 1329v JH 755
	Studies of Three Peasants and a Head	April 1885	Kröller-Müller Museum, Otterlo	Nuenen	F 1328v JH 757
	Sketches of the OLd Tower and Figures	May 1885	Kröller-Müller Museum, Otterlo	Nuenen	F 1336r JH 767
	Sketches for the Drawing of an Auction House	May 1885	Kröller-Müller Museum, Otterlo	Nuenen	F 1112r JH 768
	Sale of Building Scrap	May 1885	Van Gogh Museum, Amsterdam	Nuenen	F 1231r JH 769
	Sale of Building Scrap	May 1885	Van Gogh Museum, Amsterdam	Nuenen	F 1231v JH 771
	Sketches of a Man with a Ladder, Other Figures, and a Cemetery	May 1885	Kröller-Müller Museum, Otterlo	Nuenen	F 1336v JH 773
	Three People Sharing a Meal	May 1885	Van Gogh Museum, Amsterdam	Nuenen	F 1229v JH 775
	Stocky Man	May–June 1885	Van Gogh Museum, Amsterdam	Nuenen	F 1332r JH 758
	Stocky Man	May–June 1885	Van Gogh Museum, Amsterdam	Nuenen	F 1331; JH 759
	Three Studies of a Woman with a Shawl	May–June 1885	Van Gogh Museum, Amsterdam	Nuenen	F 1298r JH 765
	Woman, Sitting by the Fire, Peeling Potatoes; Sketch of a Second Figure	May–June 1885	Kröller-Müller Museum, Otterlo	Nuenen	F 1211; JH 791
	Peasant Woman Lifting Potatoes	May–June 1885	Van Gogh Museum, Amsterdam	Nuenen	F 1258; JH 892
	Peasant Woman Lifting Potatoes	May–June 1885	Van Gogh Museum, Amsterdam	Nuenen	F 1256; JH 897
	Studies for Figures Carrying Bundles of Wood	June 1885	Van Gogh Museum, Amsterdam	Nuenen	F 1297v JH 795
	Cottage	June 1885	Van Gogh Museum, Amsterdam	Nuenen	F 1344; JH 801
	Landscape with Cottages and a Mill	June 1885	Van Gogh Museum, Amsterdam	Nuenen	F 1345; JH 802
	Landscape in Stormy Weather	June 1885	Van Gogh Museum, Amsterdam	Nuenen	F 1346; JH 804
	Peasant Woman Digging	July–September 1885	Van Gogh Museum, Amsterdam	Nuenen	F 1255; JH 826
	Peasant Woman Stooping and Gleaning	July 1885	Museum Folkwang, Essen	Nuenen	F 1279; JH 836
	Peasant, Digging	July 1885	Kröller-Müller Museum, Otterlo	Nuenen	F 1311; JH 848
	Woman by a Hearth	August 1885	Van Gogh Museum, Amsterdam	Nuenen	F 1288; JH 797
	Peasant with Sickle Seen from Behind	August 1885	Rijksmuseum, Amsterdam	Nuenen	F 1312; JH 854
	Two Peasant Women, Digging	August 1885	Kröller-Müller Museum, Otterlo	Nuenen	F 1295; JH 875
	Peasant Woman, Working with a Long Stick	August 1885	Kröller-Müller Museum, Otterlo	Nuenen	F 1277; JH 880
	Peasant Woman at the Washtub and Peasant Woman Hanging Up the Laundry	August 1885	Private collection	Nuenen	F 1284; JH 907
	Peasant Woman, Planting Potatoes	August 1885	Städel Museum, Frankfurt	Nuenen	F 1272; JH 910
	Stooks and a Peasant Stacking Sheaves	August 1885	Van Gogh Museum, Amsterdam	Nuenen	F 1339; JH 912
	Stooks and a Mill	August 1885	Van Gogh Museum, Amsterdam	Nuenen	F 1340; JH 913
	Wheatfield with Reaper and Peasant Woman Binding Sheaves	August 1885	Van Gogh Museum, Amsterdam	Nuenen	F 1321r JH 915
	Vicarage at Nuenen	October 1885	Unknown	Nuenen	F 1343a JH 951
	Landscape with Pollard Willows	November 1885	Private collection	Nuenen	F 1247; JH 953
	Couple Dancing	December 1885	Van Gogh Museum, Amsterdam	Nuenen	F 1350b JH 969
	Couple Making Love	December 1885	Van Gogh Museum, Amsterdam	Nuenen	
	The Spire of the Church of Our Lady	December 1885	Van Gogh Museum, Amsterdam	Nuenen	F 1356; JH 974
	Head of a Man	December 1885	Van Gogh Museum, Amsterdam	Antwerp	F 1358; JH 980
	Head of an Old Man	December 1885	Van Gogh Museum, Amsterdam	Antwerp	F 1359; JH 984
	City View	December–January 1885–86	Van Gogh Museum, Amsterdam	Antwerp	F 1355; JH 966
	Sketch of a Knee	January 1886	Van Gogh Museum, Amsterdam	Antwerp	F 1693c JH 987
	Sketch of a Knee	January 1886	Van Gogh Museum, Amsterdam	Antwerp	F 1693d JH 988
	Sketch of a Left Hand	January 1886	Van Gogh Museum, Amsterdam	Antwerp	F 1693f JH 989
	Sketch of a Left Hand	January 1886	Van Gogh Museum, Amsterdam	Antwerp	F 1693g JH 990
	Standing Female Nude Seen from the Front	January–February 1886	Van Gogh Museum, Amsterdam	Antwerp	F 1696; JH 1011
	Standing Female Nude Seen from the Front	January–February 1886	Van Gogh Museum, Amsterdam	Antwerp	F 1699; JH 1013
	Seated Man with a Moustache and Cap	January–February 1886	Van Gogh Museum, Amsterdam	Antwerp	F 1369r JH 1017
	Seated Man with a Beard	January–February 1886	Van Gogh Museum, Amsterdam	Antwerp	F 1369v JH 1018
	Seated Man with a Beard	January–February 1886	Van Gogh Museum, Amsterdam	Antwerp	F 1370; JH 1087
	Standing Man Seen from the Back	January–February 1886	Van Gogh Museum, Amsterdam	Antwerp	F 1706; JH 1088
	Sketch of a Foot	February 1886	Van Gogh Museum, Amsterdam	Antwerp	F 1697v JH 1001
	Sketch of a Right Arm and Shoulder	February 1886	Van Gogh Museum, Amsterdam	Antwerp	F 1693j JH 1006

=== Paris ===
Image	Title	Date	Current location	Created in	Catalogue No.
	A Square in Paris	1886	Van Gogh Museum, Amsterdam	Paris	F 1354; JH 963
	The Terrace of the Tuileries with People Walking	1886	Van Gogh Museum, Amsterdam	Paris	F 1384; JH 1021
	Jardin de Luxembourg	1886	AMJ Museum, Amsterdam	Paris	F 1383; JH 1025
	View of Paris with Notre-Dame and the Panthéon	1886	Vincent Wilem van gogh Museum, Amsterdam	Paris	F 1387; JH 1098
	The Hill of Montmartre	1886	Van Gogh Museum, Amsterdam	Paris	F 1398; JH 1174
	Le Moulin de la Galette	1886	The Phillips Collection, Washington D.C.	Paris	F 1396a JH 1185
	Le Moulin de la Galette	1886	Van Gogh Museum, Amsterdam	Paris	F 1395; JH 1188
	Sketch of a House; Two Lovers	1886	Van Gogh Museum, Amsterdam	Paris	F 1705v
	Skeleton	1886–87	Van Gogh Museum, Amsterdam	Paris	F 1361; JH 998
	Standing Male Nude Seen from the Front	1886–87	Van Gogh Museum, Amsterdam	Paris	F 1364-1; JH 1007
	Standing Male Nude Seen from the Front	1886–87	Van Gogh Museum, Amsterdam	Paris	F 1364-2; JH 1008
	Standing Male Nude Seen from the Front	1886–87	Van Gogh Museum, Amsterdam	Paris	F 1362; JH 1009
	Seated Female Nude	1886–87	Van Gogh Museum, Amsterdam	Paris	F 1700; JH 1010
	Standing Female Nude Seen from the Back	1886–87	Van Gogh Museum, Amsterdam	Paris	F 1698; JH 1012
	Standing Male and Seated Female Nudes	1886–87	Van Gogh Museum, Amsterdam	Paris	F 1363ar JH 1014
	Standing Female Nude Seen from the Back	1886–87	Van Gogh Museum, Amsterdam	Paris	F 1710r JH 1036
	L'Écorché and Borghese Gladiator	1886–87	Van Gogh Museum, Amsterdam	Paris	F 1702r JH 1037
	L'Écorché	1886–87	Van Gogh Museum, Amsterdam	Paris	F 1702v JH 1038
	Studies of a Seated Girl, L'Écorché and Venus	1886–87	Van Gogh Museum, Amsterdam	Paris	F 1366r JH 1039
	Seated Girl Seen from the Front	1886–87	Van Gogh Museum, Amsterdam	Paris	F 1367; JH 1043
	Seated Girl and Venus	1886–87	Van Gogh Museum, Amsterdam	Paris	F 1366v JH 1044
	Torso of Venus	1886–87	Van Gogh Museum, Amsterdam	Paris	F 1363av JH 1063
	Torso of Venus	1886–87	Van Gogh Museum, Amsterdam	Paris	F 1708v JH 1065
	Torso of Venus	1886–87	Van Gogh Museum, Amsterdam	Paris	F 1371r JH 1068
	Torso of Venus	1886–87	Van Gogh Museum, Amsterdam	Paris	F 1363b JH 1069
	Bust of a Young Warrior	1886–87	Van Gogh Museum, Amsterdam	Paris	F 1701r JH 1081
	Seated Male Nude Seen from the Back	1886–87	Van Gogh Museum, Amsterdam	Paris	F 1701v JH 1085
	Strollers and Onlookers at a Place of Entertainment	1887	Van Gogh Museum, Amsterdam	Paris	F 1692; JH 993
	A Guinguette	1887	Van Gogh Museum, Amsterdam	Paris	F 1407; JH 1034
	Torso of Venus and a Landscape	1887	Van Gogh Museum, Amsterdam	Paris	F 1712v JH 1053
	Torso of Venus	1887	Van Gogh Museum, Amsterdam	Paris	F 1712r JH 1056
	Torso of Venus	1887	Van Gogh Museum, Amsterdam	Paris	F 1711v JH 1057
	Torso of Venus	1887	Van Gogh Museum, Amsterdam	Paris	F 1713r JH 1061
	Torso of Venus	1887	Van Gogh Museum, Amsterdam	Paris	F 1711r JH 1062
	Torso of Venus	1887	Van Gogh Museum, Amsterdam	Paris	F 1363cr JH 1070
	Kneeling Écorché	1887	Van Gogh Museum, Amsterdam	Paris	F 1363d JH 1075
	Male Torso and Study for 'Portrait of a Woman with Flowers'	1887	Van Gogh Museum, Amsterdam	Paris	F 1713v JH 1077
	Study for "Woman Sitting by a Cradle"	1887	Van Gogh Museum, Amsterdam	Paris	F 1244bv JH 1151
	Seated Woman	1887	Van Gogh Museum, Amsterdam	Paris	F 1718; JH 1152
	Clarinetist and Piccolo Player	1887	Van Gogh Museum, Amsterdam	Paris	F 1444br JH 1155
	Barn Owl Viewed from the Front	1887	Van Gogh Museum, Amsterdam	Paris	F 1373v JH 1189
	Barn Owl Viewed from the Side	1887	Van Gogh Museum, Amsterdam	Paris	F 1373r JH 1190
	Studies: Figure; The Enclosure Wall of Saint Paul's Hospital; and Others	1887	Van Gogh Museum, Amsterdam	Paris	F 1375
	Self-Portrait	1887	Van Gogh Museum, Amsterdam	Paris	F 1379; JH 1196
	Two Self-Portraits	1887	Van Gogh Museum, Amsterdam	Paris	F 1378r JH 1198
	Sorrowing Woman	1887	Van Gogh Museum, Amsterdam	Paris	F 1378v
	Study for 'Reclining Female Nude	1887	Van Gogh Museum, Amsterdam	Paris	F 1404; JH 1213
	The Boulevard de Clichy	1887	Van Gogh Museum, Amsterdam	Paris	F 1393; JH 1217
	View from the Apartment in the Rue Lepic	1887	Van Gogh Museum, Amsterdam	Paris	F 1391; JH 1220
	Restaurant de la Sirène at Asnières	1887	Van Gogh Museum, Amsterdam	Paris	F 1408; JH 1252
	Sailing Boat on the Seine at Asnières	1887	Van Gogh Museum, Amsterdam	Paris	F 1409; JH 1276
	Study of the Paris Ramparts	1887	Van Gogh Museum, Amsterdam	Paris	F 1719; JH 1279 (Note: De la Faille both Paris ramparts sketches (JH 1279 and JH 1282 under the same catalogue number, whereas Hulsker listed them under two different numbers.)
	Study of the Paris Ramparts	1887	Van Gogh Museum, Amsterdam	Paris	F 1719; JH 1282
	Study of the Paris Ramparts	1887	Van Gogh Museum, Amsterdam	Paris	F 1719v JH 1285
	Swift	1887	Van Gogh Museum, Amsterdam	Paris	F 1244v JH 1290
	Apartment Blocks and Miscellaneous Studies	1887	Van Gogh Museum, Amsterdam	Paris	F 1374; JH 1291
	Couple Out for a Stroll	1887	Van Gogh Museum, Amsterdam	Paris	F 1720; JH 1308
	Portrait of Père Tanguy	1887	Van Gogh Museum, Amsterdam	Paris	F 1412; JH 1350

=== Arles ===
Image	Title	Date	Current location	Created in	Catalogue No.
	Landscape with Path and Pollard Trees	March 1888	Van Gogh Museum, Amsterdam	Arles	F 1499; JH 1372
	Field with Factory	March 1888	Courtauld Gallery, London	Arles	F 1500; JH 1373
	Orchard with Arles in the Background	April 1888	The Hyde Collection, New York	Arles	F 1516; JH 1376
	Langlois Bridge at Arles Seen from the Road	March 1888	Staatsgalerie Stuttgart	Arles	F 1470; JH 1377
	Orchard with Blossoming Plum Trees (The White Orchard)	April 1888	Van Gogh Museum, Amsterdam	Arles	F 1414; JH 1385
	Tiled Roof with Chimneys and Church Tower	April 1888	Private collection	Arles	F 1480a JH 1403
	The Rhone with Boats and a Bridge	April 1888	Staatliche Graphische Sammlung, Munich	Arles	F 1472; JH 1404
	Canal with Bridge and Women Washing	April 1888	Staatliche Graphische Sammlung, Munich	Arles	F 1473; JH 1405
	Meadow with Flowers	April 1888	Van Gogh Museum, Amsterdam	Arles	F 1474; JH 1407
	Public Garden with Vincent's House in the Background	April 1888	Van Gogh Museum, Amsterdam	Arles	F 1513; JH 1412
	Field with Flowers	April 1888	Rhode Island School of Design Museum, Providence	Arles	F 1416r JH 1415
	The park at Arles	April 1888	Art Institute of Chicago	Arles	F 1468; JH 1498
	Farmhouse with Wheat Field along a Road	May 1888	Van Gogh Museum, Amsterdam	Arles	F 1415; JH 1408
	Drawbridge in Arles	May 1888	Rhode Island School of Design Museum, Providence	Arles	F 1416v
	Drawbridge with Lady with Parasol	15 May 1888	Los Angeles County Museum of Art	Arles	F 1471; JH 1420
	The Plain of La Crau	May 1888	Museum Folkwang, Essen	Arles	F 1419; JH 1430
	Landscape with a Tree in the Foreground	May 1888	Private collection	Arles	F 1418; JH 1431
	The Plain of La Crau	May 1888	Unknown	Arles	F 1448; JH 1432
	Landscape with Arles in the Background	May 1888	Museum Boijmans Van Beuningen, Rotterdam	Arles	F 1475; JH 1435
	Two Cottages at Saintes-Maries-de-la-Mer	May–June 1888	Morgan Library & Museum, New York	Arles	F 1440; JH 1451
	Cottages in Saintes-Maries	May–June 1888	Philadelphia Museum of Art	Arles	F 1436; JH 1454
	Beach, Sea and Fishing Boats	May–June 1888	Van Gogh Museum, Amsterdam	Arles	F 1432; JH 1455
	Landscape with Hut in the Camargue	May–June 1888	Van Gogh Museum, Amsterdam	Arles	F 1498r JH 1457
	Entrance Gate to a Farm with Haystacks	June 1888	Rijksmuseum, Amsterdam	Arles	F 1478; JH 1444
	Landscape with the Wall of a Farm	June 1888	Israel Museum, Jerusalem	Arles	F 1478a JH 1445
	View of Saintes-Maries with Church and Ramparts	June 1888	Private collection	Arles	F 1439; JH 1446
	Three Cottages in Saintes-Maries	June 1888	Van Gogh Museum, Amsterdam	Arles	F 1438; JH 1448
	Street in Saintes-Maries	June 1888	Private collection	Arles	F 1434; JH 1449
	Fishing Boats on the Beach at Saintes-Maries	June 1888	Private collection	Arles	F 1428; JH 1458
	Head of a Girl	June 1888	Solomon R. Guggenheim Museum, New York	Arles	F 1507a JH 1466
	Sheaves of Wheat	June 1888	Van Gogh Museum, Amsterdam	Arles	F 1641; JH 1484
	Wheat Field	June 1888	Kunstmuseum, Winterthur	Arles	F 1514; JH 1546
	Gypsies at Saintes-Maries	June 1888	Unknown	Arles	F 1721
	Zouave Sitting, Whole Figure	June 1888	Van Gogh Museum, Amsterdam	Arles	F 1443; JH 1485
	View of a River, Quay, and Bridge	17 July 1888	Private collection	Arles	F 1507; JH 1469
	On the Road to Tarascon	July 1888	Kunsthaus Zürich	Arles	F 1502; JH 1492
	Landscape with Trees	July 1888	Art Institute of Chicago	Arles	F 1518; JH 1493
	Landscape with a Tree in the Foreground	July 1888	Virginia Museum of Fine Arts, Richmond	Arles	F 1509; JH 1494
	Road with Trees	July 1888	Albertina, Vienna	Arles	F 1518a JH 1495
	Landscape with Alphonse Daudet's Windmill	July 1888	Van Gogh Museum, Amsterdam	Arles	F 1496; JH 1496
	Bank of the Rhone at Arles	July 1888	Museum Boijmans-van Beuningen, Rotterdam	Arles	F 1472a JH 1497a
	La Crau seen from Montmajour	13 July 1888	Van Gogh Museum, Amsterdam	Arles	F 1420; JH 1501
	Landscape near Montmajour with Train	13 July 1888	British Museum, London	Arles	F 1424; JH 1502
	Montmajour	July 1888	Van Gogh Museum, Amsterdam	Arles	F 1447; JH 1503
	Hill with the Ruins of Montmajour	13 July 1888	Rijksmuseum, Amsterdam	Arles	F 1446; JH 1504
	Fishing Boats at Sea	17 July 1888	Kupferstichkabinett Berlin	Arles	F 1430; JH 1505
	Street in Saintes-Maries	July 1888	Museum of Modern Art, New York	Arles	F 1453; JH 1506
	La Roubine du Roi with Washerwomen	17 July 1888	Kröller-Müller Museum, Otterlo	Arles	F 1444; JH 1507
	Sower with Setting Sun	July 1888	Private collection	Arles	F 1442; JH 1508
	Newly Mowed Lawn with Weeping Tree	July 1509	Private collection	Arles	F 1450; JH 1509
	Garden with Flowers	July 1888	Private collection	Arles	F 1455; JH 1512
	Haystacks near a Farm	July 1888	Museum of Fine Arts, Budapest	Arles	F 1426; JH 1514
	Wheat Field	17 July 1888	Metropolitan Museum of Art, New York	Arles	F 1481; JH 1515
	Wheat Field	17 July 1888	National Gallery of Art, Washington D.C.	Arles	F 1491; JH 1516
	Wheat Field with Sheaves	17 July 1888	Kupferstichkabinett Berlin	Arles	F 1488; JH 1517
	Rocks with Oak Tree	17 July 1888	Private collection	Arles	F 1554; JH 1518
	La Mousmé Sitting	23 July 1888	Pushkin Museum, Moscow	Arles	F 1504; JH 1520
	La Mousmé, Sitting	23 July 1888	Louvre, Paris	Arles	F 1722; JH 1521
	Joseph Roulin, Sitting in a Cane Chair, Three-Quarter-Length	31 July-6 August 1888	Private collection	Arles	F 1723; JH 1523
	Haystacks near a Farm	31 July-6 August 1888	Philadelphia Museum of Art	Arles	F 1427; JH 1525
	Fishing Boats at Saintes-Maries	31 July-6 August 1888	Solomon R. Guggenheim Museum, New York	Arles	F 1430a JH 1526
	Harvest Landscape	31 July-6 August 1888	National Gallery of Art, Washington D.C.	Arles	F 1486; JH 1527
	Fishing Boats at Saintes-Maries-de-la-Mer	31 July-6 August 1888	Saint Louis Art Museum	Arles	F 1433; JH 1528
	Wheat Field with Sheaves and Arles in the Background	31 July-6 August 1888	Private collection	Arles	F 1490; JH 1529
	Wheat Field with Sheaves	31 July-6 August 1888	Private collection	Arles	F 1489; JH 1530
	The Road to Tarascon	31 July-6 August 1888	Solomon R. Guggenheim Museum, New York	Arles	F 1502a JH 1531
	Garden with Flowers	31 July-6 August 1888	Private collection	Arles	F 1454; JH 1532
	La Mousmé, Half-Figure	31 July-6 August 1888	Private collection	Arles	F 1503; JH 1533
	Lawn with Weeping Tree	31 July-6 August 1888	Private collection	Arles	F 1449; JH 1534
	Zouave, Half Figure	31 July-6 August 1888	Solomon R. Guggenheim Museum New York	Arles	F 1482a JH 1535
	Portrait of the Postman Joseph Roulin	August 1888	Getty Museum	Arles	F 1458; JH 1536
	A Garden with Flowers	August 1888	Private collection	Arles	F 1456; JH 1537
	Harvest Landscape	August 1888	Kupferstichkabinett Berlin	Arles	F 1485; JH 1540
	Fishing Boats at Sea	August 1888	Royal Museums of Fine Arts of Belgium, Brussels	Arles	F 1430b JH 1541
	A Fishing Boat at Sea	August 1888	Unknown	Arles	F 1431; JH 1542
	Sower with Setting Sun	August 1888	Van Gogh Museum, Amsterdam	Arles	F 1441; JH 1543
	Arles: View from the Wheat Field	August 1888	Getty Center, Los Angeles	Arles	1492; JH 1544
	Newly Mowed Lawn with Weeping Tree	August 1888	Menil Collection, Houston	Arles	F 1451; JH 1545
	Joseph Roulin, Three-Quarter-Length	August 1888	Los Angeles County Museum of Art	Arles	F 1459; JH 1547
	Portrait of Patience Escalier	August 1888	Fogg Art Museum, Harvard University	Arles	F 1460; JH 1549
	Thistles along the Roadside	August 1888	Van Gogh Museum, Amsterdam	Arles	F 1466; JH 1549
	Quay with Men Unloading Sand Barges	August 1888	Cooper Hewitt Museum	Arles	F 1462; JH 1556
	The Old Peasant Patience Escalier with Walking Stick, Half-Figure	August 1888	Private collection	Arles	F 1461; JH 1564
	Café Terrace at Night	September 1888	Dallas Museum of Art	Arles	F 1519; JH 1579
	Bush in the Park at Arles: The Poet's Garden II	September 1888	Private collection	Arles	F 1465; JH 1583
	The Yellow House	September 1888	Private collection	Arles	F 1453; JH 1590
	Starry Night Over the Rhône	September 1888	Unknown	Arles	F 1515; JH 1593
	Interior of a Restaurant	October 1888	Van Gogh Museum, Amsterdam	Arles	F 1508v JH 1611
	A Lane in the Public Garden with Benches	October 1888	Van Gogh Museum, Amsterdam	Arles	F 1498v JH 1614
	Garden of the Hospital in Arles	April 1889	Van Gogh Museum, Amsterdam	Arles	F 1467; JH 1688

=== Saint-Rémy ===
Image	Title	Date	Current location	Created in	Catalogue No.
	Trees with Ivy	May 1889	Van Gogh Museum, Amsterdam	Saint-Rémy	F 1522; JH 1695
	Great Peacock Moth	May 1889	Van Gogh Museum, Amsterdam	Saint-Rémy	F 1523; JH 1700
	Large Cuckoo Pint	May 1889	Van Gogh Museum, Amsterdam	Saint-Rémy	F 1613; JH 1703
	Barred Windows	May 1889	Van Gogh Museum, Amsterdam	Saint-Rémy	F 1605v JH 1704
	Fountain in the garden of the Hospital Saint-Paul	May, 1889	Van Gogh Museum, Amsterdam	Saint-Rémy	F 1531; JH 1705
	Tassel Hyacinth	May 1889	Van Gogh Museum, Mozart	Saint-Rémy	F 1615; JH 2059
	Mountain Landscape Seen across the Walls	June 1889	Van Gogh Museum, Amsterdam	Saint-Rémy	F 1549v JH 1721
	Mountain Landscape Seen across the Walls	June 1889	Van Gogh Museum, Amsterdam	Saint-Rémy	F 1547; JH 1724
	Wheat Field with Cypresses	June 1889	Morgan Library & Museum, New York	Saint-Rémy	F 1548; JH 1726
	Bird's-Eye View of Saint-Rémy	June 1889	Van Gogh Museum, Amsterdam	Saint-Rémy	F 1541v JH 1729
	Landscape with Cypresses	June 1889	Van Gogh Museum, Amsterdam	Saint-Rémy	F 1541r JH 1730
	Starry Night	June 1889	Shchusev Museum of Architecture, Moscow	Saint-Rémy	F 1540; JH 1732
	Olive Trees in a Mountain Landscape	June 1889	Metropolitan Museum of Art, New York	Saint-Rémy	F 1544; JH 1741
	Cypresses	June 1889	Brooklyn Museum	Saint-Rémy	F 1525; JH 1747
	Cypresses	June 1889	Art Institute of Chicago	Saint-Rémy	F 1524; JH 1749
	Field with Poppies	June 1889	Private collection	Saint-Rémy	F 1494; JH 1752
	Wheat Field with Reaper	June 1889	Kupferstichkabinett Berlin	Saint-Rémy	F 1546; JH 1754
	Wheat Field with Cypresses	June 1889	Van Gogh Museum, Amsterdam	Saint-Rémy	F 1538; JH 1757
	Three Cicadas	June 1889	Van Gogh Museum, Amsterdam	Saint-Rémy	F 1445; JH 1765
	A Bare Treetop in the Garden of the Asylum	October 1889	Van Gogh Museum, Amsterdam	Saint-Rémy	F 1576r JH 1817
	Pine Trees in Front of the Wall of the Asylum	October 1889	Private collection	Saint-Rémy	F 1564; JH 1825
	A Group of Pine Trees	November 1889	Private collection	Saint-Rémy	F 1567; JH 1828
	A Corner of the Asylum and the Garden with a Heavy, Sawn-Off Tree	November 1889	Private collection	Saint-Rémy	F 1545; JH 1851
	Enclosed Field behind Saint-Paul Hospital	November–December 1889	Staatliche Graphische Sammlung München, Munich	Saint-Rémy	F 1552; JH 1863
	Women Picking Olives	December 1889	Van Gogh Museum, Amsterdam	Saint-Rémy	F 1729; JH 1867
	Cypresses with two Women in the Foreground	February 1890	Kröller-Müller Museum, Otterlo	Saint-Rémy	F 1525a JH 1887
	Cypresses with Four People Working in the Field	February–March 1890	Museum Folkwang, Essen	Saint-Rémy	F 1539r JH 1889
	Six Sketches of Figures, Among Others a Man Sowing Wheat	February–March 1890	Museum Folkwang, Essen	Saint-Rémy	F 1539v
	Studies of a Man Digging and a Landscape with Cypresses	February–March 1890	Van Gogh Museum, Amsterdam	Saint-Rémy	F 1593v JH 1890
	Sun over Walled Wheat Field	March–April 1890	Kröller-Müller Museum, Otterlo	Saint-Rémy	F 1728; JH 1706
	Enclosed Field with a Sower in the Rain	March–April 1890	Museum Folkwang, Essen	Saint-Rémy	F 1550; JH 1897
	A Sower and a Man with a Spade	March–April 1890	Private collection	Saint-Rémy	F 1645r JH 1902
	Sketches of a Cottage and Figures	March–April 1890	Private collection	Saint-Rémy	F 1649v JH 1904
	Sketches of a Cottage and Figures	March–April 1890	Van Gogh Museum, Amsterdam	Saint-Rémy	F 1600v JH 1905
	Snow-Covered Cottages with Cypresses and Figures	March–April 1890	Van Gogh Museum, Amsterdam	Saint-Rémy	F 1593r JH 1906
	Snow-Covered Cottages, a Couple with a Child	March–April 1890	Van Gogh Museum, Amsterdam	Saint-Rémy	F 1591r JH 1907
	Cottage with Three Figures	March–April 1890	Van Gogh Museum, Amsterdam	Saint-Rémy	F 1591v JH 1908
	Sketch of Diggers and Other Figures	March–April 1890	Morgan Library & Museum, New York	Saint-Rémy	F 1620r JH 1911
	Landscape with Cottage and Two Figures	March–April 1890	Van Gogh Museum, Amsterdam	Saint-Rémy	F 1597v JH 1912
	Snow-Covered Cottages with Figures	March–April 1890	Private collection	Saint-Rémy	F 1648r JH 1913
	Cottage and Trees	March–April 1890	Private collection	Saint-Rémy	F 1648v JH 1914
	Farmers Digging and Cottages	March–April 1890	Van Gogh Museum, Amsterdam	Saint-Rémy	F 1594r JH 1915
	Sketch of a Tree against Clouds with Colour Annotations	March–April 1890	Van Gogh Museum, Amsterdam	Saint-Rémy	F 1583; JH 1917
	Sketch of Clouds with Colour Annotations	March–April 1890	Van Gogh Museum, Amsterdam	Saint-Rémy	F 1584; JH 1918
	Peasant Woman Digging	March–April 1890	Van Gogh Museum, Amsterdam	Saint-Rémy	F 1586v JH 1924
	Landscape with Cottages	March–April 1890	Van Gogh Museum, Amsterdam	Saint-Rémy	F 1598r JH 1925
	Sheet with Numerous Figure Sketches	March–April 1890	Private collection	Saint-Rémy	F 1649r JH 1926
	Sheet with Sketches of Diggers and Other Figures	March–April 1890	Van Gogh Museum, Amsterdam	Saint-Rémy	F 1602v JH 1927
	Sheet with Sketches of Diggers and Other Figures	March–April 1890	Van Gogh Museum, Amsterdam	Saint-Rémy	F 1600r JH 1928
	Sheet with Sketches of Working People	March–April 1890	Van Gogh Museum, Amsterdam	Saint-Rémy	F 1599r JH 1929
	Sheet with Sketches of Figures	March–April 1890	Van Gogh Museum, Amsterdam	Saint-Rémy	F 1604r JH 1930–1931 (Note: De la Faille listed these sketches under the same catalogue number, whereas Hulsker listed them under two different numbers.)
	Sheet with Numerous Sketches of Working People	March–April 1890	Van Gogh Museum, Amsterdam	Saint-Rémy	F 1598v JH 1932
	Sheet with Sketches of Peasants	March–April 1890	Van Gogh Museum, Amsterdam	Saint-Rémy	F 1599v JH 1933
	Sheet with Sketches of a Digger and Other Figures	March–April 1890	Morgan Library & Museum, New York	Saint-Rémy	F 1620v JH 1934
	Sheet with Sketches of Working People	March–April 1890	Van Gogh Museum, Amsterdam	Saint-Rémy	F 1605r JH 1935
	Sheet with Two Sowers and Hands	March–April 1890	Van Gogh Museum, Amsterdam	Saint-Rémy	F 1603r JH 1936
	Sheet with Hands and Several Figures	March–April 1890	Van Gogh Museum, Amsterdam	Saint-Rémy	F 1603v JH 1937
	Sheet with Walking Woman and Walking Man	March–April 1890	Van Gogh Museum, Amsterdam	Saint-Rémy	F 1607r JH 1938
	Sheet with Two Woman Doing Laundry	March–April 1890	Van Gogh Museum, Amsterdam	Saint-Rémy	F 1607v JH 1939
	Sheet with a Woman at a Table and a Woman Walking	March–April 1890	Van Gogh Museum, Amsterdam	Saint-Rémy	F 1606r JH 1940
	Sheet with a Digger and a Dog	March–April 1890	Van Gogh Museum, Amsterdam	Saint-Rémy	F 1606v JH 1941
	Sketch of a Stooping Man	March–April 1890	Van Gogh Museum, Amsterdam	Saint-Rémy	F 1596av JH 1942
	Couple Arm in Arm and Other Figures, with a Windmill in the Background	March–April 1890	Van Gogh Museum, Amsterdam	Saint-Rémy	F 1596r JH 1943
	Sketch of a Peasant Working	March–April 1890	Van Gogh Museum, Amsterdam	Saint-Rémy	F 1551v JH 1947
	Three Peasants with Spades on a Road in the Rain	March–April 1890	Van Gogh Museum, Amsterdam	Saint-Rémy	F 1597r JH 1949
	Couple Walking Arm in Arm with a Child in the Rain	March–April 1890	Van Gogh Museum, Amsterdam	Saint-Rémy	F 1589r JH 1951
	Sketches of People Sitting on Chairs	March–April 1890	Van Gogh Museum, Amsterdam	Saint-Rémy	F 1601v JH 1952
	Sheet with People Sitting on Chairs	March–April 1890	Van Gogh Museum, Amsterdam	Saint-Rémy	F 1601r JH 1953
	Sheet with Two Groups of Peasants at a Meal	March–April 1890	Van Gogh Museum, Amsterdam	Saint-Rémy	F 1588; JH 1954
	Sheet with Figures at a Table, a Sower, Clogs, etc.	March–April 1890	Private collection	Saint-Rémy	F 1651r JH 1955
	Sheet with Figures and Hands	March–April 1890	Private collection	Saint-Rémy	F 1651v JH 1956
	Sheet with Peasants Eating and Other Figures	March–April 1890	Unknown	Saint-Rémy	F 1595v JH 1957
	Sketch of the Painting The Potato Eaters	March–April 1890	Van Gogh Museum, Amsterdam	Saint-Rémy	F 1594v JH 1958
	Three Peasants at a Meal	March–April 1890	Van Gogh Museum, Amsterdam	Saint-Rémy	F 1596v JH 1959
	Child and Woman Pouring Coffee	March–April 1890	Van Gogh Museum, Amsterdam	Saint-Rémy	F 1589v JH 1960
	Chair near the Stove	March–April 1890	Van Gogh Museum, Amsterdam	Saint-Rémy	F 1510; JH 1964
	Chair and Sketch of a Hand	March–April 1890	Unknown	Saint-Rémy	F 1549r JH 1965
	Chair	March–April 1890	Van Gogh Museum, Amsterdam	Saint-Rémy	F 1512r JH 1966
	Several Figures on a Road with Trees	March–April 1890	Private collection	Saint-Rémy	F 1647v JH 1968
	Carriage and Two Figures on a Road	March–April 1890	Van Gogh Museum, Amsterdam	Saint-Rémy	F 1587r JH 1969
	Sun Disk above a Path between Shrubs	April 1890	Private collection	Saint-Rémy	F 1553; JH 1900

=== Auvers-sur-Oise ===
Image	Title	Date	Current location	Created in	Catalogue No.
	Cottages with a Woman Working in the Foreground	May 1890	Louvre, Paris	Auvers-sur-Oise	F 1653; JH 1993
	Cottages with a Woman Working in the Foreground	May 1890	Art Institute of Chicago	Auvers-sur-Oise	F 1642; JH 1994
	Village Street	May 1890	Van Gogh Museum, Amsterdam	Auvers-sur-Oise	F 1638r JH 1996
	Standing Male Nude	May 1890	Van Gogh Museum, Amsterdam	Auvers-sur-Oise	F 1508r
	Still Life: Can, Books, Wineglass, Bread and Arum; Sketch of Two Women and a Girl	May–June 1890	Private collection	Auvers-sur-Oise	F 1650r
	Seated Nude (after Bargues)	June 1890	Van Gogh Museum, Amsterdam	Auvers-sur-Oise	F 1609v
	Landscape with the Oise	June 1890	Van Gogh Museum, Amsterdam	Auvers-sur-Oise	F 1627; JH 2024
	Landscape with the Oise	June 1890	Van Gogh Museum, Amsterdam	Auvers-sur-Oise	F 1629; JH 2025
	Little Stream Surrounded by Bushes	June 1890	Van Gogh Museum, Amsterdam	Auvers-sur-Oise	F 1628; JH 2026
	Mademoiselle Gachet at the Piano	June 1890	Van Gogh Museum, Amsterdam	Auvers-sur-Oise	F 1623r JH 2047
	Sketches of Peasant Plowing with Horses	June 1890	Van Gogh Museum, Amsterdam	Auvers-sur-Oise	F 1724v
	Sketch of an Eroded Garden-Wall Ornament	June–July 1890	Van Gogh Museum, Amsterdam	Auvers-sur-Oise	F 1520r JH 1733
	Sketch of an Eroded Garden-Wall Ornament	June–July 1890	Van Gogh Museum, Amsterdam	Auvers-sur-Oise	F 1596ar JH 1738
	Dead Leaf and Pod	June–July 1890	Van Gogh Museum, Amsterdam	Auvers-sur-Oise	F 1611; JH 2058
	Blossoming Branches	June–July 1890	Van Gogh Museum, Amsterdam	Auvers-sur-Oise	F 1612; JH 2059
	Branch with Leaves	June–July 1890	Van Gogh Museum, Amsterdam	Auvers-sur-Oise	F 1614; JH 2060
	Sketch of a Donkey	June–July 1890	Van Gogh Museum, Amsterdam	Auvers-sur-Oise	F 1631; JH 2063
	Sketch of Cows and Children	June–July 1890	Van Gogh Museum, Amsterdam	Auvers-sur-Oise	F 1632; JH 2064
	Lady with Checked Dress and Hat	June–July 1890	Musée d'Orsay, Paris	Auvers-sur-Oise	F 1644v JH 2065
	Three Studies	1890	Private collection	Auvers-sur-Oise	F 1646r
	A Steamer with Several People		Private collection	Auvers-sur-Oise	F 1646v
	Sketch of Two Women	June–July 1890	Van Gogh Museum, Amstertam	Auvers-sur-Oise	F 1634r JH 2067
	Sketch of a Hen	June–July 1890	Van Gogh Museum, Amstertam	Auvers-sur-Oise	F 1731; JH 2068
	Sketches of a Hen and a Cock	June–July 1890	Van Gogh Museum, Amstertam	Auvers-sur-Oise	F 1654v JH 2070
	Sheet with Many Sketches of Figures	June–July 1890	Private collection	Auvers-sur-Oise	F 1652r JH 2071
	Sketch of a Lady with Striped Dress and Hat; and of Another Lady, Half-Figure	June–July 1890	Frances Lehman Loeb Art Center, Poughkeepsie	Auvers-sur-Oise	F 1619r JH 2072
	Study of a Woman Standing; Two Heads; Another Figure	June–July 1890	Frances Lehman Loeb Art Center, Poughkeepsie	Auvers-sur-Oise	F 1619v
	Couple Walking	June–July 1890	Private collection	Auvers-sur-Oise	F 1650v JH 2073
	Sheet with a Few Sketches of Figures	June–July 1890	Private collection	Auvers-sur-Oise	F 1652v JH 2074
	Sketch of a Woman with a Baby in her Lap	June–July 1890	Louvre, Paris	Auvers-sur-Oise	F 1617; JH 2076
	Sketch of a Couple Walking with a Child	June–July 1890	Louvre, Paris	Auvers-sur-Oise	F 1616; JH 2077
	Landscape with Houses among Trees and a Figure	June–July 1890	Legion of Honor, San Francisco	Auvers-sur-Oise	F 1589a JH 2078
	The Town Hall at Auvers	June–July 1890	Van Gogh Museum, Amsterdam	Auvers-sur-Oise	F 1630r JH 2080
	Women Working in Wheat Field	June–July 1890	Van Gogh Museum, Amsterdam	Auvers-sur-Oise	F 1615v JH 2085
	Carriage drawn by a horse	June–July 1890	Van Gogh Museum, Amsterdam	Auvers-sur-Oise	F 1609r JH 2089
	Carriage	June–July 1890	Van Gogh Museum, Amsterdam	Auvers-sur-Oise	F 1610r JH 2090
	Sketch of Women in a Field	June–July 1890	Van Gogh Museum, Amsterdam	Auvers-sur-Oise	F 1610v JH 2091
	Baby in a Carriage	June–July 1890	Van Gogh Museum, Amsterdam	Auvers-sur-Oise	F 1633; JH 2092
	Study of a Fruit Tree	June–July 1890	Van Gogh Museum, Amsterdam	Auvers-sur-Oise	F 1623v JH 2094

== See also ==
Articles that include drawings, water-colours or prints:

- Early works of Vincent van Gogh
- List of works by Vincent van Gogh
- Flowering Orchards (Van Gogh series)
- Hospital in Arles (Van Gogh series)
- Langlois Bridge at Arles (Van Gogh series)
- Portrait of Dr. Gachet
- Saintes-Maries (Van Gogh series)
- Yellow House (painting)
- The Zouave

== Resources ==
Due to the considerable number of works on paper by Van Gogh, for a valid identification reference is to the numbers of Jacob Baart de la Faille's Catalogue raisonné (1928 & 1970) (F) or to Jan Hulsker's updated compilation (1978, revised 1989) (JH).
