= Head of a Girl =

1888 drawing by Vincent van Gogh

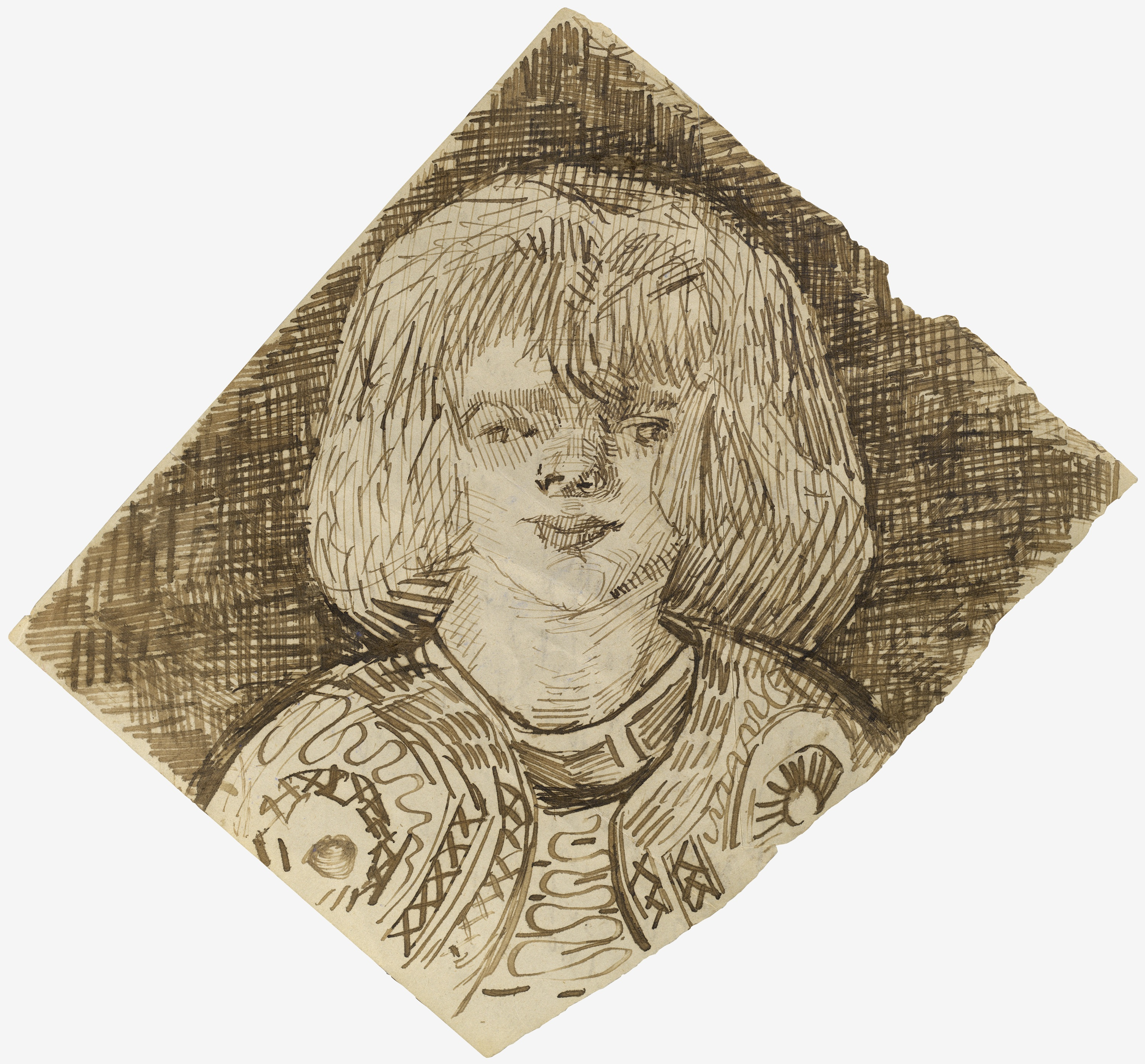
- Artist: Vincent van Gogh
- Year: 1888
- Medium: Reed pen and ink on wove paper
- Dimensions: 18 cm × 19.5 cm (7.1 in × 7.7 in)
- Location: Solomon R. Guggenheim Museum; New York

Toward the end of his life, Vincent van Gogh began to explore portraiture. Before he was ready to have friends and family sit for him, his subjects were anonymous like the portrait Head of a Girl. He sent this portrait, as well as the one depicted in The Zouave, drawn in late June, 1888, in a letter to his friend the Australian painter John Russell.

Van Gogh was interested in creating character studies of real, not idealized people, emulating Honoré Daumier and the great Dutch masters. In this portrait he demonstrates this "in his imaginative embellishment of the street child's clothes and unruly hair". In his letters van Gogh also discloses his disdain for such individuals by calling the girl a "dirty mudlark".

This painting is part of the Thannhauser Collection at the Guggenheim Museum in New York City.

== See also ==
- List of works by Vincent van Gogh
