= Marsh with Water Lilies =

1881 drawing by Vincent van Gogh

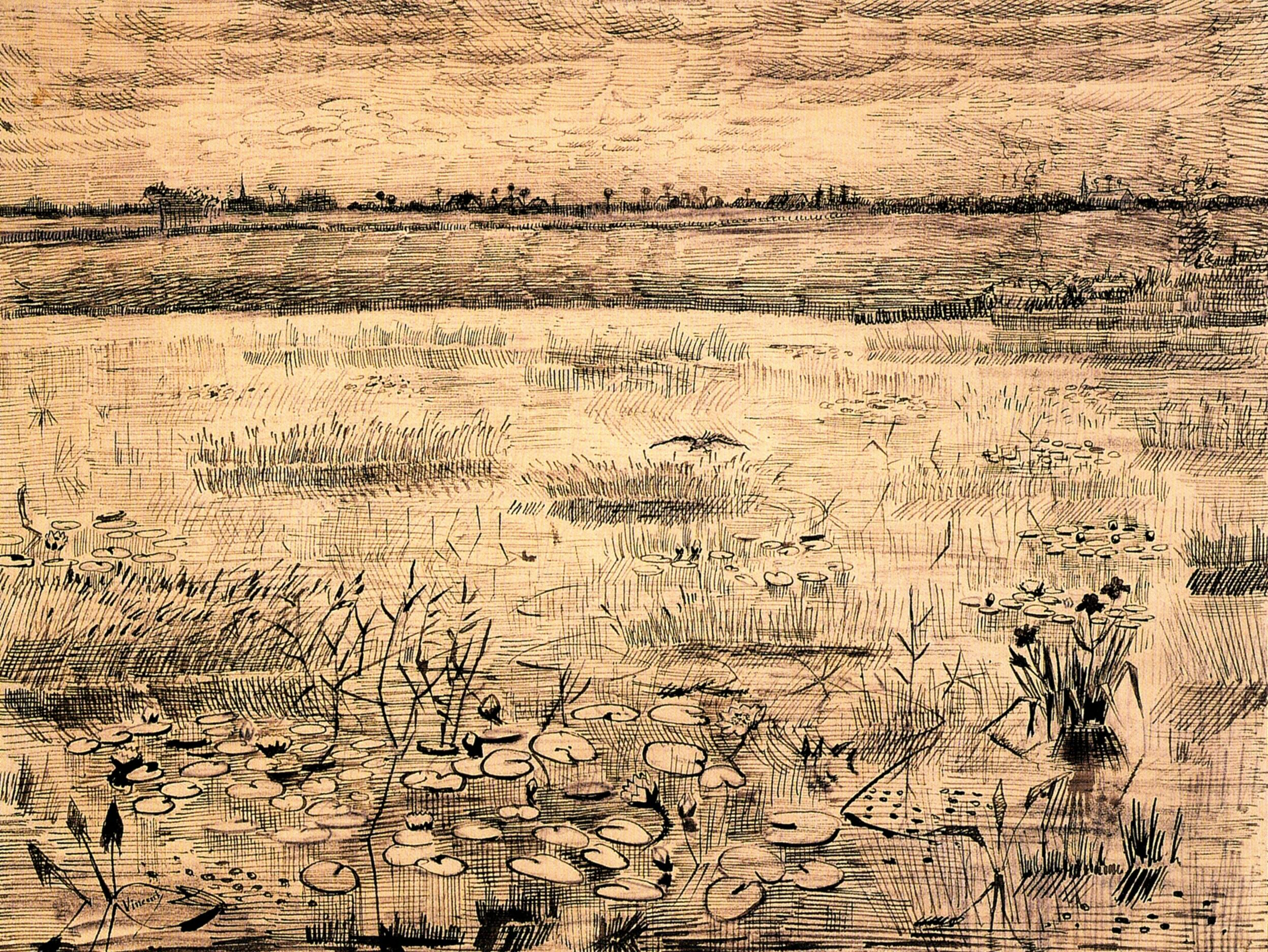
- Artist: Vincent van Gogh
- Year: 1881
- Catalogue: F845 JH7
- Type: Pencil, pen, reed pen
- Dimensions: 23.5 cm × 31 cm (9.25 in × 12.25 in)
- Location: Private collection

Marsh with Water Lilies is a drawing by Vincent van Gogh. It was executed at Etten (now Etten-Leur) in June 1881.

Vincent's father Theodorus van Gogh, a pastor, was called to Etten in 1875. Vincent spent periods of time there, notably from Easter to Christmas 1881 when he returned to join his brother Theo, an art dealer, determined to become an artist. This period at Etten represents the beginning proper of Vincent's ten-year career as an artist. He had drawn since boyhood, and the previous year had enrolled in a beginners' class in Brussels where he met the painter Anthon van Rappard, but he now began to draw in earnest. He rapidly developed an accomplished technique in landscape drawing but remained rather more uncertain in his figure drawing, which he practiced assiduously with the aid of Charles Bargue's drawing course. Rappard made a twelve-day visit during this time, and they sketched together in the marshes and heaths round Etten. Vincent also visited his cousin-in-law Anton Mauve in The Hague, a celebrated artist of the time, who had expressed an interest in his drawings and who encouraged him further. At this time Vincent had not progressed as far as painting, though he did wash some of his drawings with watercolor. At the end of the year he made an extended visit to Mauve, who introduced him to painting. He returned to Etten with the intention of setting up a studio there. However he quarreled with his father on Christmas Day and left the family home to set up his studio in The Hague instead.

== History ==
The drawing was in the holdings of Vincent's sister Wil who left Etten in June 1881 to take up a position as a governess in Amsterdam. At the same time there is a mention in a letter to Theo of Vincent making a pen drawing in the Passievaart marshes of lilies during an excursion with Anthon van Rappard, who was visiting. It is reasonable to suppose he gave this drawing as a leaving gift to Wil, thus dating the drawing as around 13 June 1881 from van Rappard's own date for his Passievaart drawing.

== Provenance ==
- Miss W. van Gogh, Dieren, Netherlands
- J.P, Scholte, Barchem, Netherlands
- Lochem, Netherlands, Mrs. A.T. Scholte-van Houten
- Scholte-van Houten collection [R 1970]

== Exhibition history ==
- 1947, Basle, 112
- 1956, Munich, 6
- 1957, Essen, 128
- 1960, Paris, 73
- 1962, Warsaw, 89
- 1963, Tel Aviv, Haifa, 7

== See also ==
- List of works by Vincent van Gogh

== Notes ==
=== Bibliography ===
- de la Faille, Jacob-Baart. The Works of Vincent van Gogh: His Paintings and Drawings. Amsterdam: Meulenhoff, 1970. ISBN 978-1556608117
- Hulsker, Jan. The Complete Van Gogh. Oxford: Phaidon, 1980. ISBN 0-7148-2028-8
- Naifeh, Steven; Smith, Gregory White. Van Gogh: The Life. Profile Books, 2011. ISBN 978-1846680106
- Pomerans, Arnold. The Letters of Vincent van Gogh. Penguin Classics, 2003. ISBN 978-0140446746
- Tralbaut, Marc Edo. Vincent van Gogh, Macmillan, London 1969, ISBN 0-333-10910-4
