= La Mousmé =

1888 painting by Vincent van Gogh

- Artist: Vincent van Gogh
- Year: 1888
- Catalogue: F431; JH1519
- Medium: Oil on canvas
- Dimensions: 73.3 cm × 60.3 cm (28.9 in × 23.7 in)
- Location: National Gallery of Art, Washington D.C.
- Accession: 1963.10.151

La Mousmé also known as La Mousmé, Sitting in a Cane Chair, Half-Figure (with a branch of oleander) was painted by Vincent van Gogh in 1888 while living in Arles, which van Gogh dubbed "the Japan of the south". Retreating from the city, he hoped that his time in Arles would evoke in his work the simple, yet dramatic expression of Japanese art.

== Height of Van Gogh's career ==
At the time that van Gogh painted the portrait, he was 35 years old and living in Arles in southern France. His paintings represented different aspects of ordinary life, such as Harvest at La Crau and this painting, La Mousmé. The sunflower paintings, some of the most recognizable of van Gogh's paintings, were created in this time. Additionally, it was noted that "His correspondence from this period conveys confidence, clarity of thought and ... relative well-being."

In a letter to his brother, Theo, he wrote, "Painting as it is now, promises to become more subtle - more like music and less like sculpture - and above all, it promises color." As a means of explanation, van Gogh explains that being like music means being comforting.

In less than 444 days van Gogh made about 100 drawings, produced more than 200 paintings, and wrote more than 200 letters. He painted quickly, but he spent time thinking about his paintings long before he starting working on them.

== The painting ==
Inspired by Pierre Loti's novel Madame Chrysanthème and Japanese artwork, van Gogh painted La Mousmé, a well-dressed Japanese girl. He wrote in a letter to his brother: "It took me a whole week...but I had to reserve my mental energy to do the mousmé well. A mousmé is a Japanese girl—Provençal in this case—twelve to fourteen years old."

Van Gogh's use of color is intended to be symbolic. The audience is drawn in by his use of contracting patterns and colors that bring in an energy and intensity to the work. Complementary shades of blue and orange, a stylistic deviation from colors of Impressionist paintings that he acquired during his exploration in Paris, stand out against the spring-like pale green in the background. La Mousmé's outfit is a blend of modern and traditional. Her outfit is certainly modern. The bright colors of skirt and jacket are of the southern region of Arles. Regarding van Gogh's painting of her features, his greatest attention is focused on the girl's face, giving her the coloring of a girl from Arles, but with a Japanese influence. The young lady's posture mimics that of the oleander. The flowering oleander, like the girl, is in the blossoming stage of life.

Van Gogh said of portrait studies, such as La Mousmé, "the only thing in painting that excites me to the depths of my soul, and which makes me feel the infinite more than anything else."

The painting is part of the National Gallery of Art collection in Washington, D.C.

== Provenance ==
- Johanna van Gogh-Bonger, the artist's sister-in-law, of Amsterdam had the painting until May 1909. Five paintings that were sold by Johanna became part of the National Gallery of Art collection.
- In May 1909 the painting was sold to J.H. de Bois, an art dealer and director of The Hague branch of the C.M. Van Gogh gallery. C.M. van Gogh was Vincent's uncle.
- After May 1909 the painting was sold to Carl Sternheim (1878–1942), German playwright and art collector of Munich. In 1912 he and his wife moved to La Hulpe, Belgium. By 1933 Sternheim's work was banned by the Nazis.
- By 1917 art collector and dealer Alphonse Kann (1870–1948) of Paris, had the painting.
- J.B. Stang of Oslo had the painting until 1928.
- On 3 January 1928 La Mousmé was sold through Dr. Alfred Gold, an art dealer of Berlin specializing in French paintings, to joint owners Alex Reid and Lefèvre gallery of Glasgow and London and M. Knoedler & Co. of New York, art dealer to some of America's wealthiest individuals.
- The painting was sold 21 May 1929 through Galerie Étienne Bignou, Paris to Chester Dale (1883–1962) of New York.
- In 1963 the painting was bequeathed to the National Gallery of Art and placed in the Dale Chester Collection. Chester Dale, as passionate and successful in his art collection as he was on the Wall Street, bequeathed in 1962 some of America's most important collections of French painting from the late 19th and early 20th centuries to the National Gallery of Art.

== La Mousmé drawing ==
There are several drawings for this painting:

- A portrait sketch, Sitting La Mousmé, is located at the Louvre, Paris, France.
- La Mousmé, Half-Figure in the Collection of Thomas Gibson Fine Art, London, United Kingdom, Europe
- La Mousmé, Sitting located in Pushkin Museum, Moscow, Russia.

== See also ==
- List of works by Vincent van Gogh
