= Torso of Venus and a Landscape =

Drawing by Vincent van Gogh

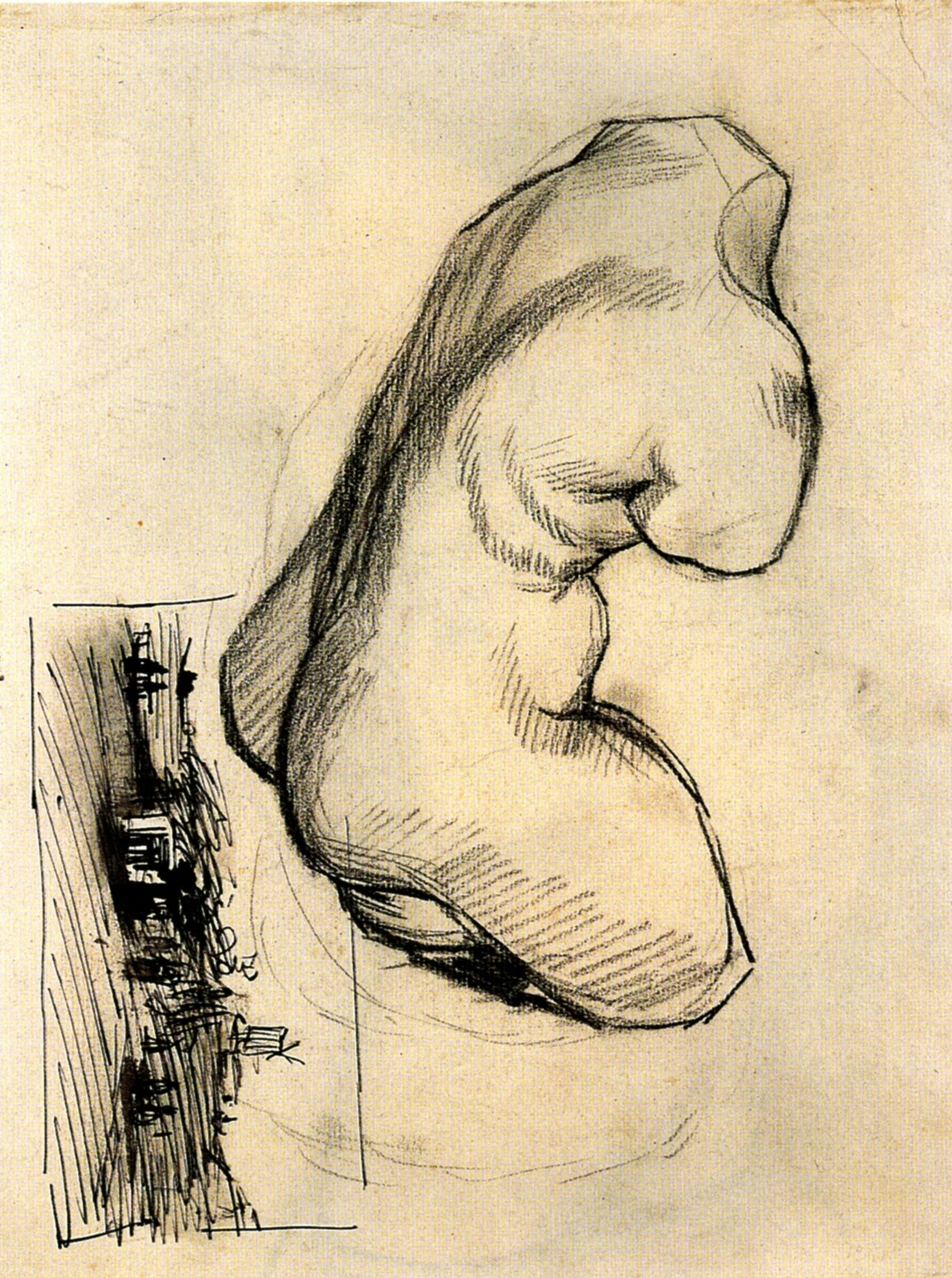
- Artist: Vincent van Gogh
- Year: 1887
- Catalogue: F1712r, JH1056
- Medium: chalk, ink on paper
- Dimensions: 32.1 cm × 24.6 cm (12.6 in × 9.7 in)
- Location: Van Gogh Museum, Amsterdam, Netherlands

Torso of Venus and a Landscape is a sketch by Post-Impressionist artist Vincent van Gogh. It now resides in the Van Gogh Museum in Amsterdam.

This drawing was created while van Gogh was staying with his brother in Paris (in 1886–1888), a period during which they did not write any letters to each other. As a result, little is known about the artist during this period except for his still-life paintings and Agostina Segatori Sitting in the Café du Tambourin. In 1887, he sketched this drawing onto a piece of paper with black chalk and ink.

Van Gogh produced other earlier paintings of Torso of Venus during his stay in Paris, such as the Torso of Venus in 1886, which was exhibited at the Van Gogh Museum in Amsterdam. It also featured a realism aspect, and was drawn with similar media. It is possible that Torso of Venus and a Landscape was a rough draft.

== See also ==
- List of works by Vincent van Gogh
