= The Zouave =

Subject of several paintings by Vincent van Gogh

Le Zouave (half-figure)
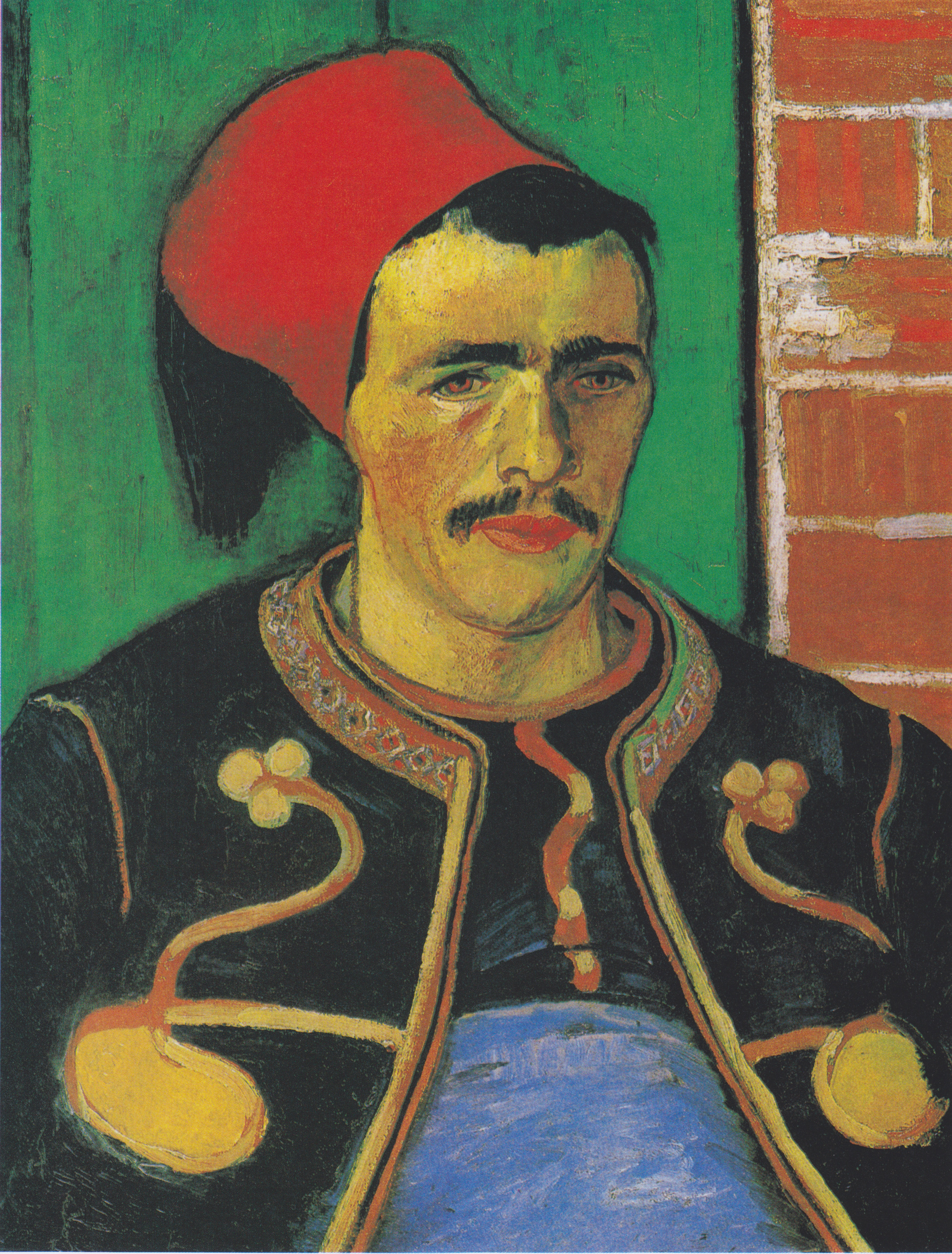
- Artist: Vincent van Gogh
- Year: June 1888
- Catalogue: F423; JH1486
- Medium: Oil on canvas
- Dimensions: 82 cm × 65 cm (32 in × 26 in)
- Location: Van Gogh Museum, Amsterdam

The Zouave is the subject of several sketches and paintings made by Vincent van Gogh in Arles, France in June 1888. The pieces range from close up oil painting portraits of the Zouave to full-body drawings. Van Gogh produced this collection of pieces during the period he spent in southern France, which many scholars regard as the zenith of his artistic career.Van Gogh nonetheless expressed frustration about his work during this time.

The well-known half-figure oil painting, Le Zouave, can be found in Amsterdam in the Van Gogh Museum along with the pencil and reed pen drawing of The Seated Zouave.

== Context ==
Vincent Van Gogh traveled to Arles in early 1888. His stay in Arles was fueled by his desire to establish a “studio of the south” where like-minded artists could collaborate as "impressionists of today." Van Gogh lived in a yellow house that he rented and simultaneously used as a studio for posing his models as well as a space for his personal gallery. His long term plan of establishing a group of artists in Arles was unsuccessful, and his letters seeking to attract other artists to the southern French city, such as Paul Gauguin, show that van Gogh felt lonely during his stay. Despite these feelings of isolation, van Gogh produced many notable pieces alongside the works featuring the Zouave, including Bedroom in Arles and Café Terrace at Night.

The French Zouave who served as the model for van Gogh's pieces was Lieutenant Milliet, and he became a close companion to the artist. Van Gogh was excited to have a model for a portrait, given the fact that he often felt as though he did not know enough people who would willingly pose for him. Despite the fact that Milliet agreed to pose for a portrait, the pair did not always agree on artistic matters. In fact, Milliet found van Gogh rather impatient and abrasive. Furthermore, the portraits produced by van Gogh were not particularly admired by the Lieutenant, but he recognized that keeping silent on the matter would serve him well rather than voicing his dissatisfaction.

== Analysis ==
The collection of pieces capturing the Zouave highlight the range of adopted techniques and artistic experiments that van Gogh utilized during his time in southern France. In a letter to his fellow artist friend Gauguin, van Gogh expressed his desire to use a reduced color palette in order to express poetic ideas. In a letter to his brother, he revealed his wish to use "the actual radiance and vibrations of our colorings" to portray his subjects as almost ethereal. This approach is evident particularly in the half-length portrait, Le Zouave (half-figure). The painting presents a tanned man through bright colors he called a "savage combination of incongruous tones." The Zouave's uniform is blue with red-orange braids, a red cap and two yellow stars on his chest, all placed against the background of a green door and orange bricks. The use of these bright reds, blues, greens and whites is also found in variations of the portrait such as The Seated Zouave (oil on canvas).

Van Gogh's limited color palette was not his only technical innovation in these works. The series of the Zouave also points to the range of artistic influences from different parts of the world that van Gogh drew inspiration from. For example, he created a pencil and reed-pen drawing of the Zouave shows signs of Japanese influence. Through the usage of reed pens combined with pencil, generally associated with Japanese artists, van Gogh achieved a textured and intricate portrayal of the Zouave's already elaborate uniform. It is unclear when this particular drawing was produced, though it is assumed to be around the same time as the paintings of the Zouave.

Van Gogh was not happy with the painting and described it as "ugly and unsuccessful,” but he thought the challenge might expand his artistic range. A possible factor that could have contributed to his dissatisfaction was the conditions during which he made this collection of portraits. In late June, during the exact days van Gogh created the pieces featuring the Zouave, Arles had torrential rainstorms for that lasted over three days straight. On June 23, van Gogh wrote a letter to his fellow artist comrade, Emile Bernard, exclaiming he was exhausted, suggesting that his dissatisfaction for his paintings was perhaps influenced by the horrid weather conditions in which he produced them in addition to his feelings of loneliness.

Yet, in a letter to his brother, van Gogh wrote "I am very dissatisfied with what I have been doing lately, because it is very ugly. But all the same, figure is interesting me more than landscape," which further suggests his stubborn dedication and enchantment in the creation of the portraits of the Zouave.

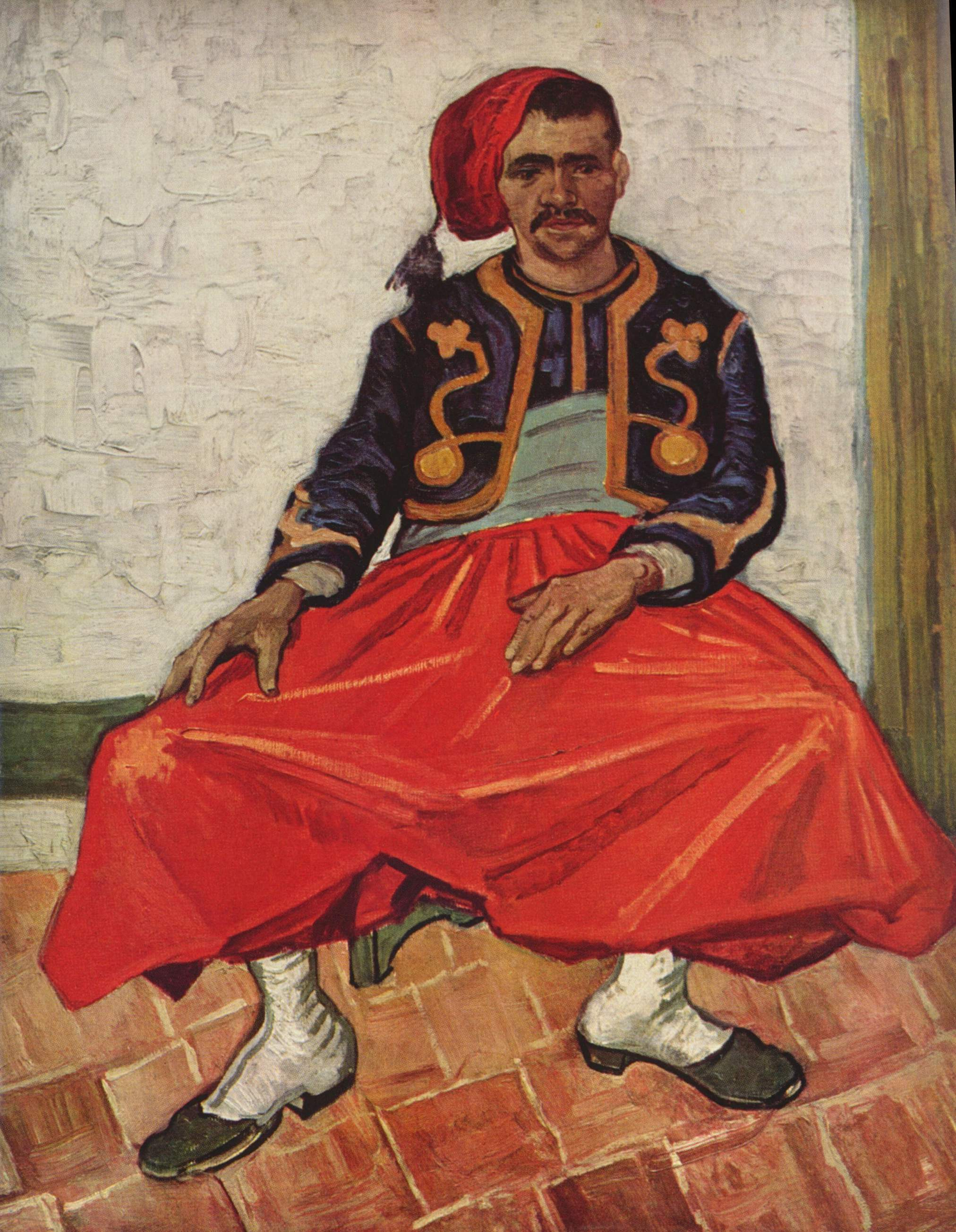
The Seated Zouave, June 1888, Private collection (F424)

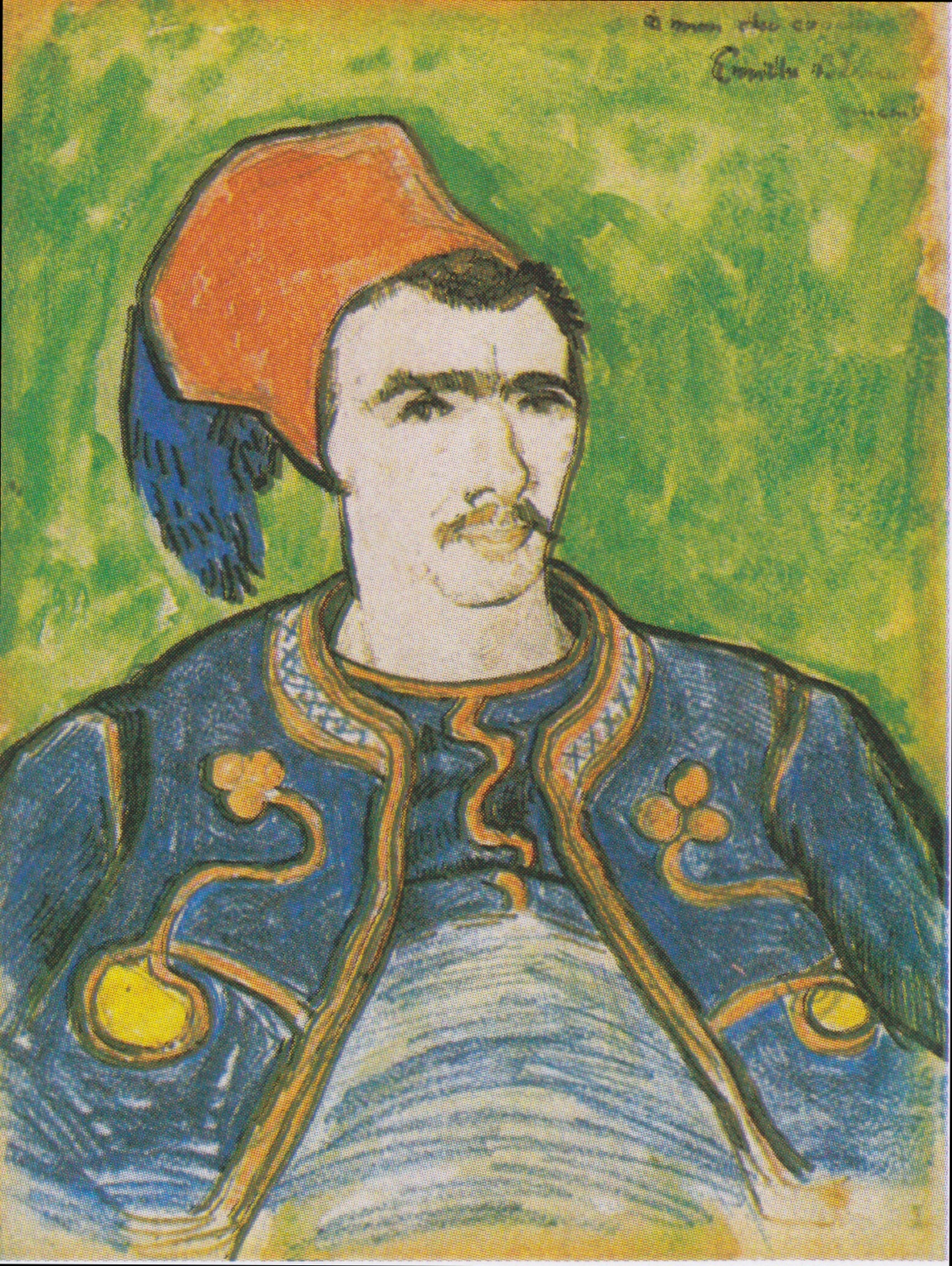
The Zouave, watercolor, 1888, Metropolitan Museum of Art, New York (F1482)

== See also ==
- List of works by Vincent van Gogh
