= Saint-Paul Asylum, Saint-Rémy (Van Gogh series) =

Series of paintings by Vincent van Gogh

Coordinates: 43°46′35″N 4°50′00″E

Hospital at Saint-Rémy-de -Provence
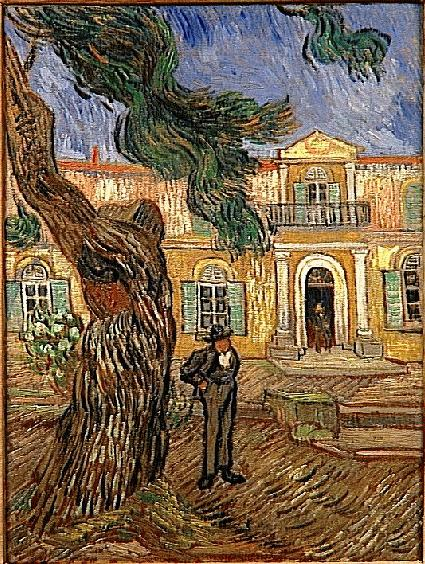
- Artist: Vincent van Gogh
- Year: 1889
- Medium: Oil on canvas
- Dimensions: 58 cm × 45 cm (23 in × 18 in)
- Location: Musée d'Orsay, Paris

Saint-Paul Asylum, Saint-Rémy is a collection of paintings that Vincent van Gogh made when he was a self-admitted patient at the Saint-Paul asylum in Saint-Rémy-de-Provence from May 1889 until May 1890. During much of his stay there he was confined to the grounds of the asylum, and he made paintings of the garden, the enclosed wheat field that he could see outside his room and a few portraits of individuals at the asylum. During his stay at Saint-Paul asylum, van Gogh experienced periods of illness when he could not paint. When he was able to resume, painting provided solace and meaning for him. Nature seemed especially meaningful to him, trees, the landscape, even caterpillars as representative of the opportunity for transformation and budding flowers symbolizing the cycle of life. One of the more recognizable works of this period is The Irises. Works of the interior of the hospital convey the isolation and sadness that he felt. From the window of his cell he saw an enclosed wheat field, the subject of many paintings made from his room. He was able to make but a few portraits while at Saint-Paul.

Within the grounds he also made paintings that were interpretations of some of his favorite paintings by artists that he admired. When he could leave the grounds of the asylum, he made other works, such as Olive Trees (Van Gogh series) and landscapes of the local area.

Van Gogh's Starry Night over the Rhone and The Irises were exhibited at the Société des Artistes Indépendants on 3 September 1889, and in January 1890 six of his works were exhibited at the seventh exhibition of Les XX in Brussels. Sadly, just as van Gogh's work was gaining interest in the artistic community, he was not well enough to fully enjoy it.

== Saint-Rémy-de-Provence ==
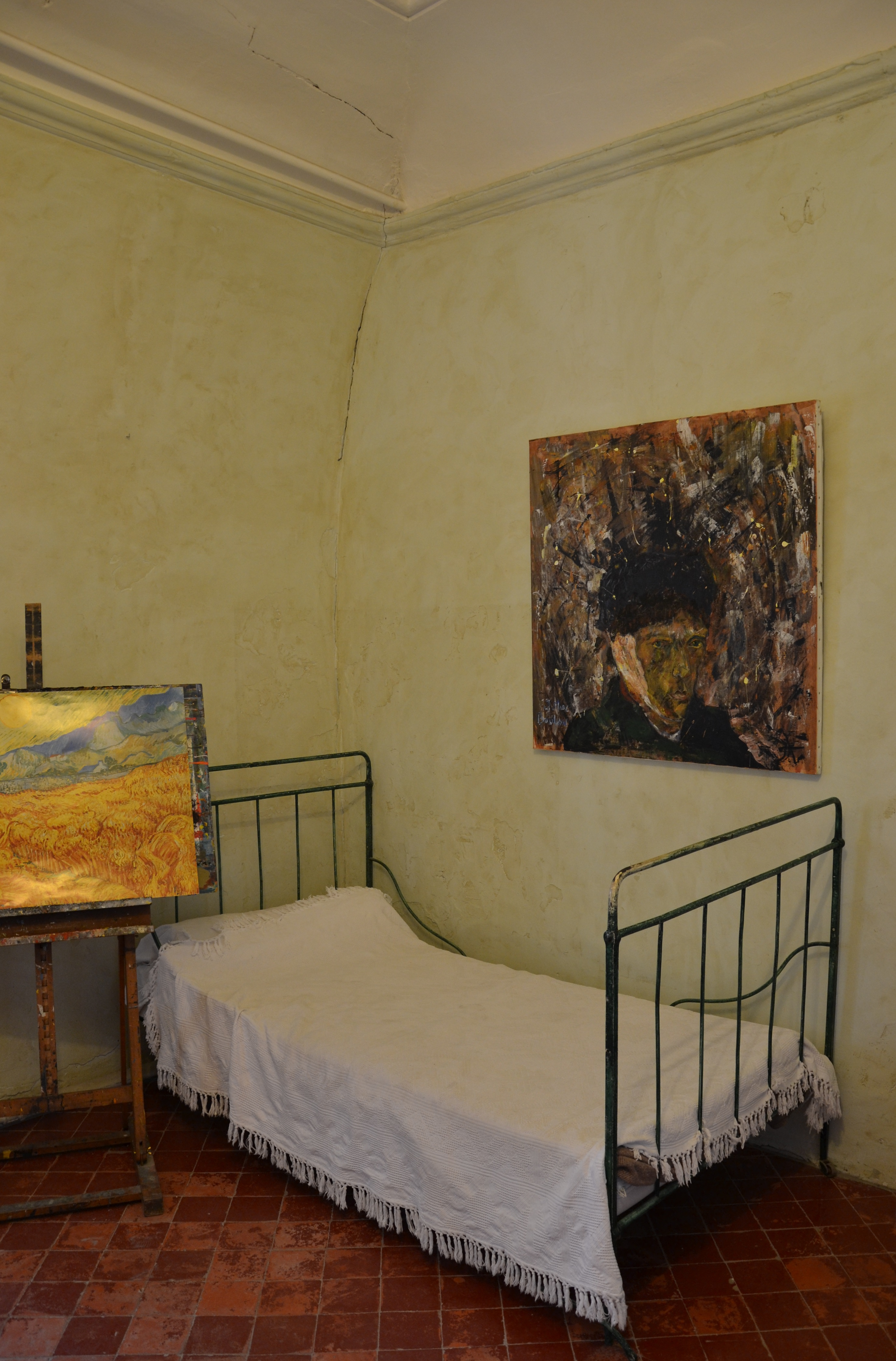
Van Gogh's room in Saint Paul de Mausole

Saint-Paul-de-Mausole, twelve miles northeast of Arles, lies just outside Saint-Rémy-de-Provence in southern France. Mentioned on several occasions by Nostradamus, who was born nearby and knew it a Franciscan convent, it was originally an Augustinian priory dating from the 12th century, and has a particularly beautiful cloister. A well-preserved set of Roman ruins known as les Antiques, the most beautiful of which is le Mausolee, adjoins the property, and forms part of the ancient Graeco-Roman city of Glanum. Mont Gaussier, which overlooks the site, and the Alpilles range can be seen in some of van Gogh's paintings.

== Events leading up to stay at the Saint-Paul hospital ==
Hospital in Arles

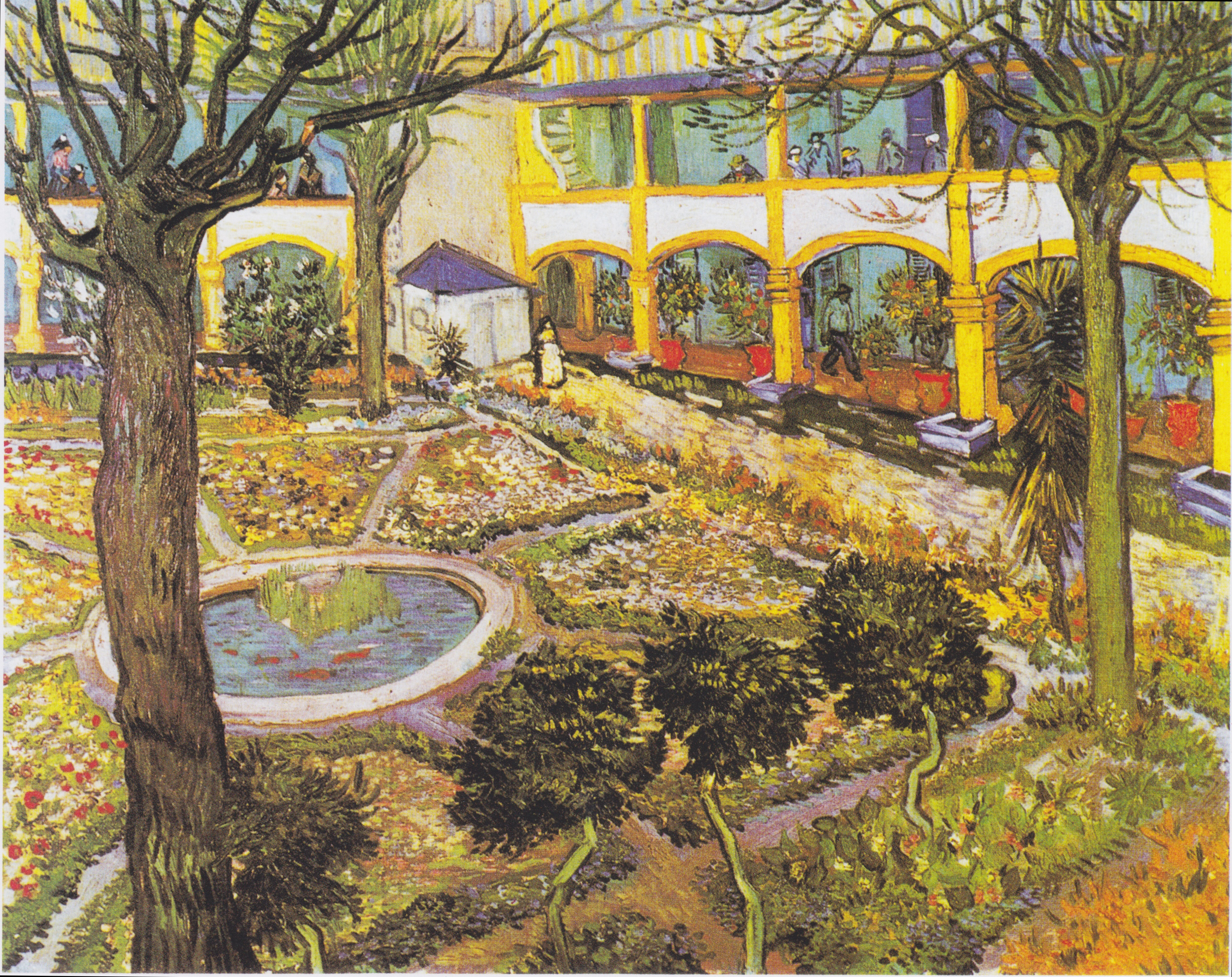
Garden of the Hospital in Arles (F519)

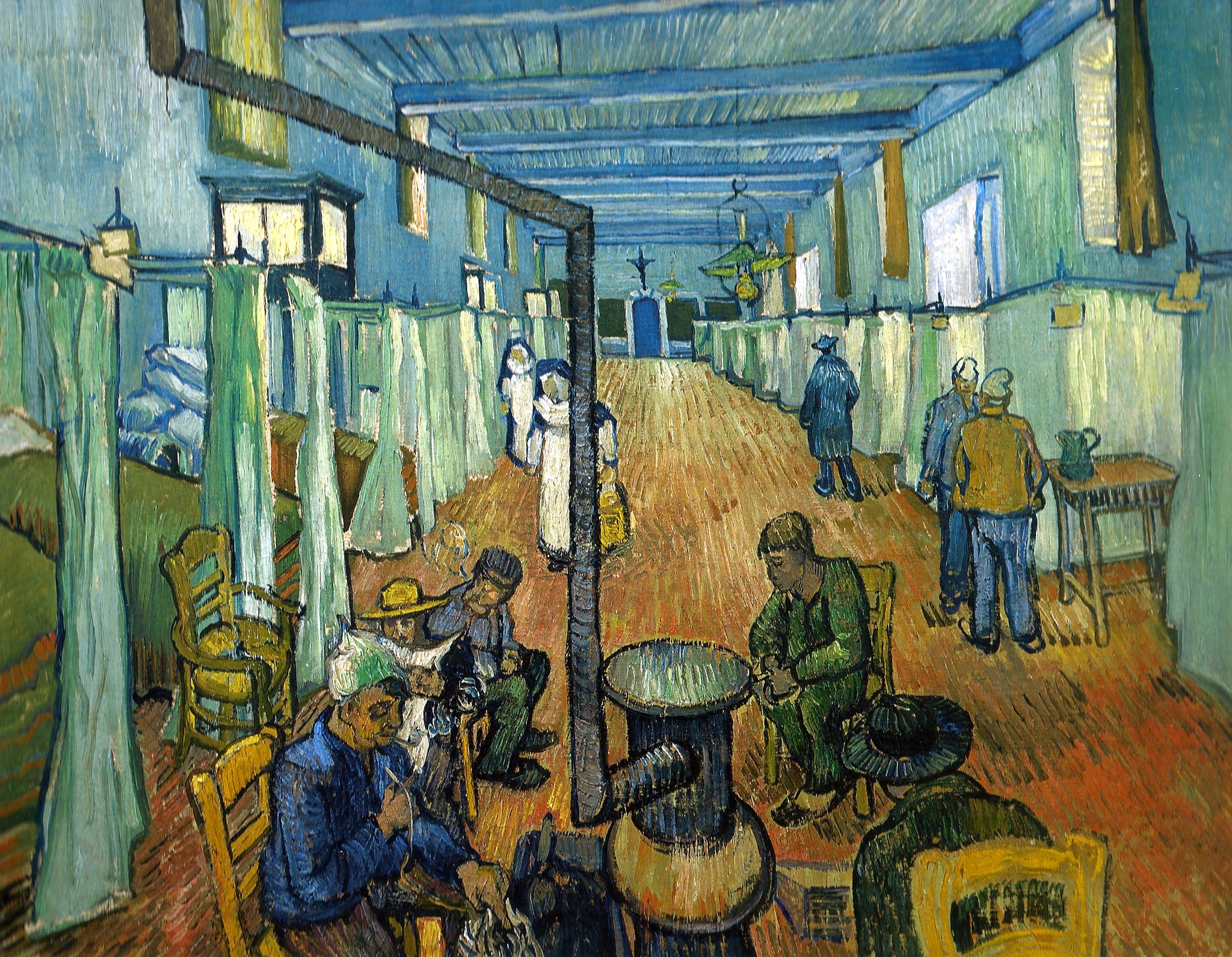
Ward in the Hospital in Arles (F646)

Following the incident with Paul Gauguin in Arles in December 1888, in which van Gogh cut off virtually all of his left ear, he was hospitalized in Arles twice over a few months. Although some, such as Johanna van Gogh, Paul Signac and posthumous speculation by doctors Doiteau & Leroy, have said that van Gogh just removed part of his ear lobe and maybe a little more, art historian Rita Wildegans maintains that without exception, all of the witnesses from Arles said that he removed the entire left ear. In January 1889, he returned to the Yellow House, where he was living, but spent the following month between hospital and home suffering from hallucinations and delusions that he was being poisoned. In March 1889, the police closed his house after a petition by 30 townspeople, who called him "fou roux" (the redheaded madman). Paul Signac visited him in hospital and van Gogh was allowed home in his company. In April 1889, he moved into rooms owned by Dr. Félix Rey, after floods damaged paintings in his own home. Around this time, he wrote, "Sometimes moods of indescribable anguish, sometimes moments when the veil of time and fatality of circumstances seemed to be torn apart for an instant." Finally, in May 1889, he left Arles and traveled to the asylum in Saint-Rémy-de-Provence.

== In Saint-Paul Hospital ==
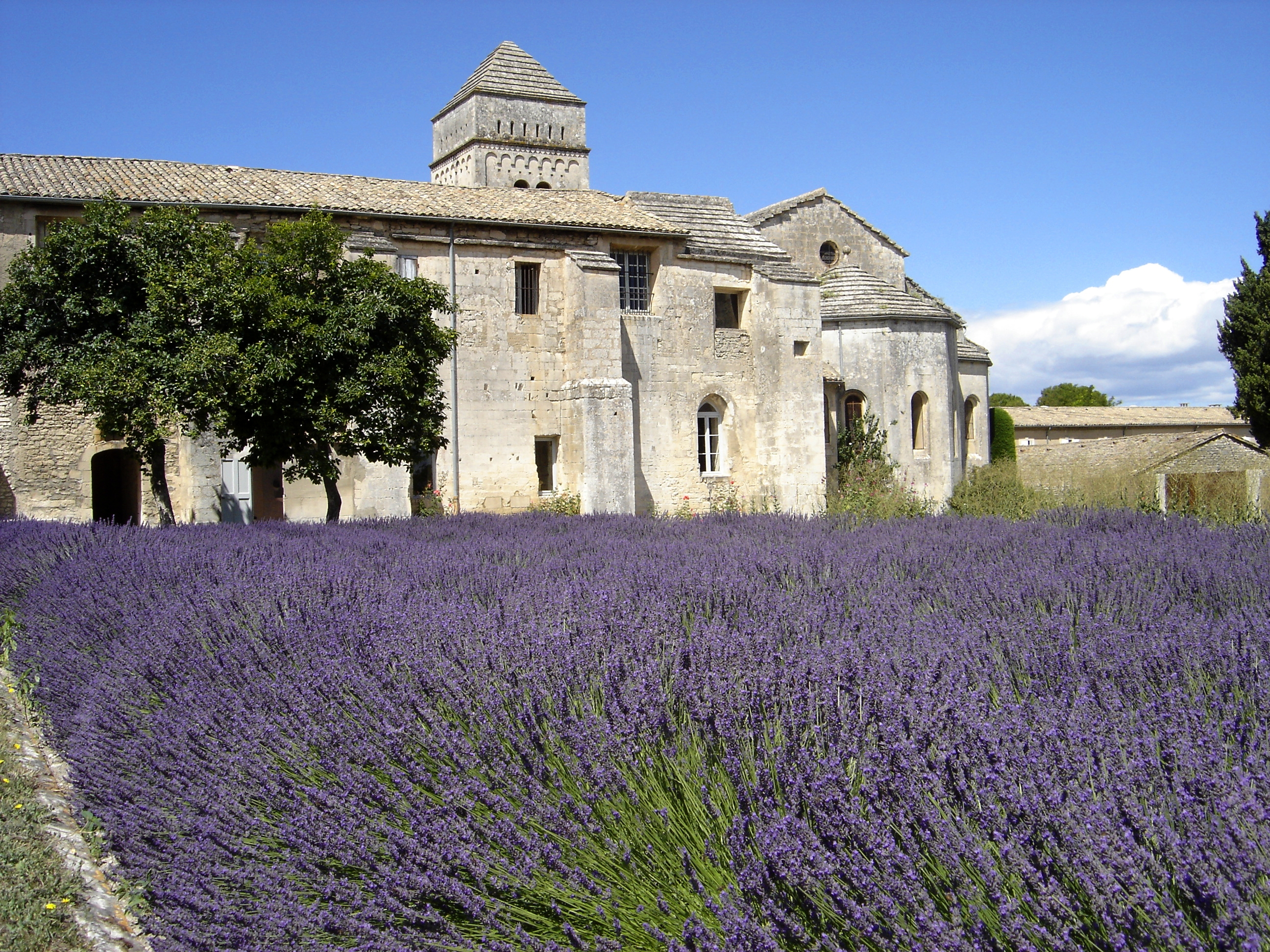
The Monastery of Saint-Paul de Mausole

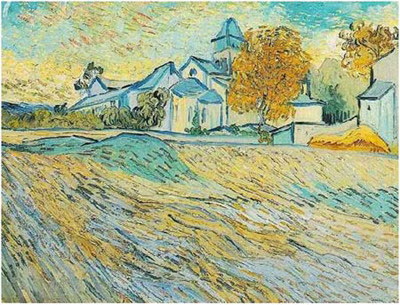
View of the Asylum and Chapel at Saint Remy 1889 Formerly collection of Elizabeth Taylor (F803)

On 8 May 1889, van Gogh voluntarily entered the asylum of St. Paul near Saint-Rémy in the Provence region of southern France. Saint-Paul, which began as an Augustine monastery in the 12th century, was converted into an asylum in the 19th century. It is located in an area of cornfields, vineyards and olive trees at the time run by a former naval doctor, Dr. Théophile Peyron. Theo arranged for two small rooms—adjoining cells with barred windows. The second was to be used as a studio.

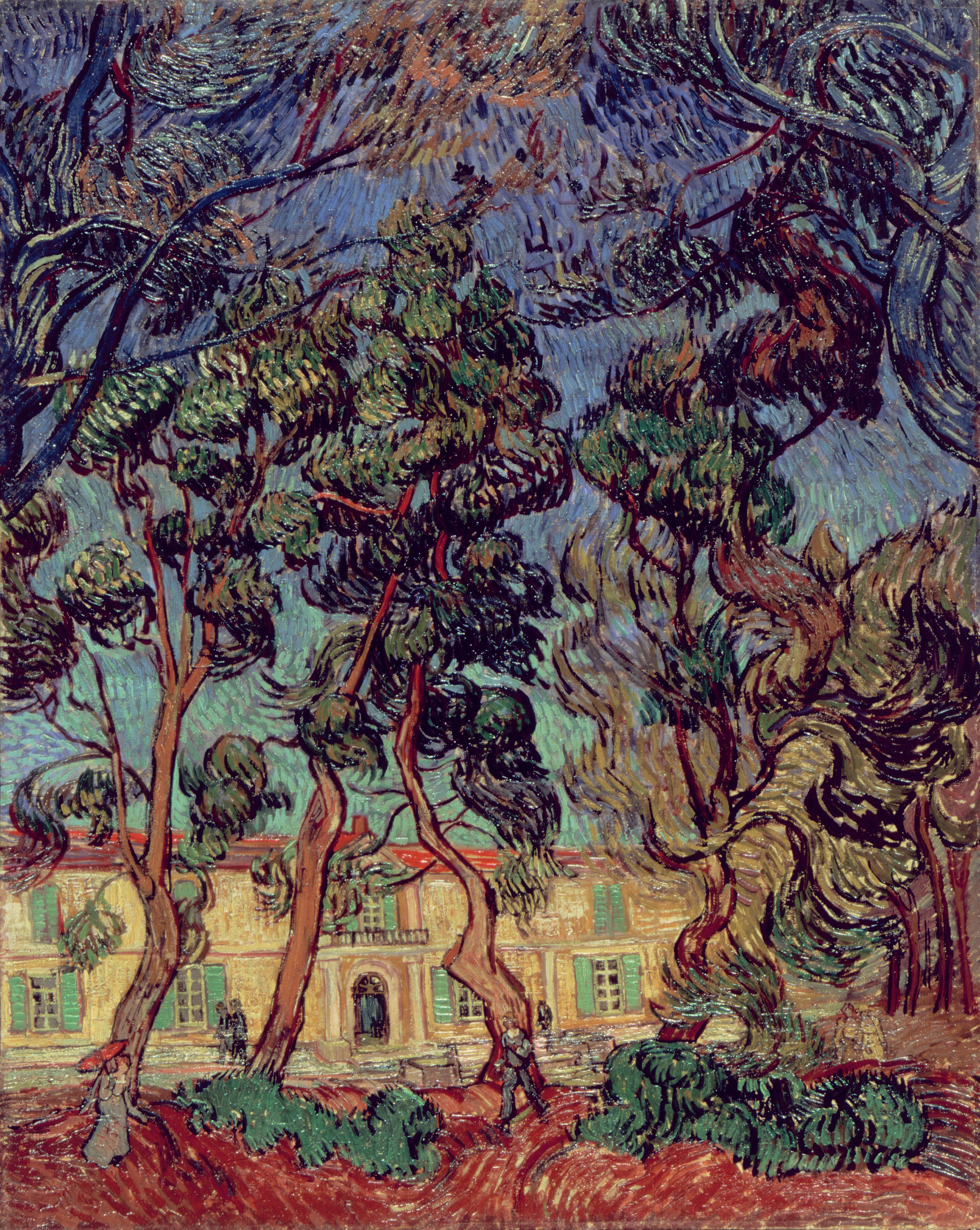
Hospital at Saint Remy, 1889, Hammer Museum collection

Van Gogh was initially confined to the immediate asylum grounds and painted (without the bars) the world he saw from his room, such as ivy covered trees, lilacs, and irises of the garden. Through the open bars van Gogh could also see an enclosed wheat field, subject of many paintings at Saint-Rémy. As he ventured outside of the asylum walls, he painted the wheat fields, olive groves, and cypress trees of the surrounding countryside, which he saw as "characteristic of Provence." Over the course of the year, he painted about 150 canvases.

The imposed regimen of asylum life gave van Gogh a hard-won stability: "I feel happier here with my work than I could be outside. By staying here a good long time, I shall have learned regular habits and in the long run the result will be more order in my life." While his time at Saint-Rémy forced his management of his vices, such as coffee, alcohol, poor eating habits and periodic attempts to consume turpentine and paint, his stay was not ideal. He needed to obtain permission to leave the asylum grounds. The food was poor; he generally ate only bread and soup. His only apparent form of treatment were two-hour baths twice a week. During his year there, van Gogh would have periodic attacks, possibly due to a form of epilepsy. By early 1890 van Gogh's attacks of illness had worsened and he believed that his stay at the asylum was not helping to make him better. This led to his plans to move to Auvers-sur-Oise just north of Paris in May 1890.

=== The corridor ===
The view down the hallway of many arches is one of profound solitude. The use of contrasts creates greater tension. A lone person in the corridor appears lost, similar to the way van Gogh was feeling. In March 1889, van Gogh wrote to his brother that a signed petition from his neighbors [in Arles] designated him as unfit to live freely, "shut up for long days under lock and key and without warders in the isolation cell, without my culpability being proven or even provable."

In a letter to Theo in May 1889 he explains the sounds that travel through the quiet-seeming halls, "There is someone here who has been shouting and talking like me all the time for a fortnight. He thinks he hears voices and words in the echoes of the corridors, probably because the auditory nerve is diseased and over-sensitive, and in my case it was both sight and hearing at the same time, which is usual at the onset of epilepsy, according to what Dr. Félix Rey said one day."

=== Entrance Hall of Saint-Paul Hospital ===
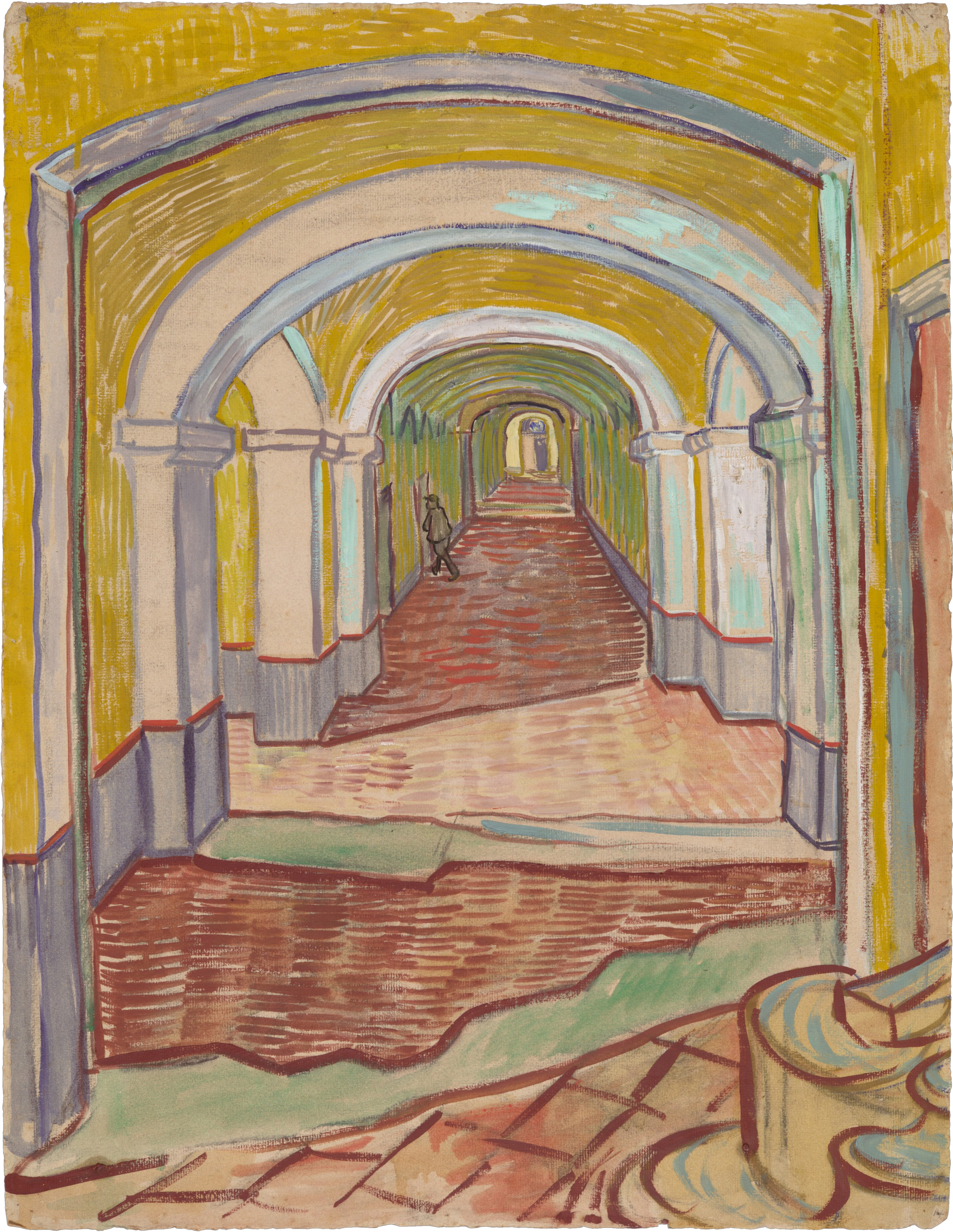
Corridor in Saint-Paul Hospital, Oil color and essence over black chalk on pink laid ("Ingres") paper
1889
The Metropolitan Museum of Art, New York (F1529)

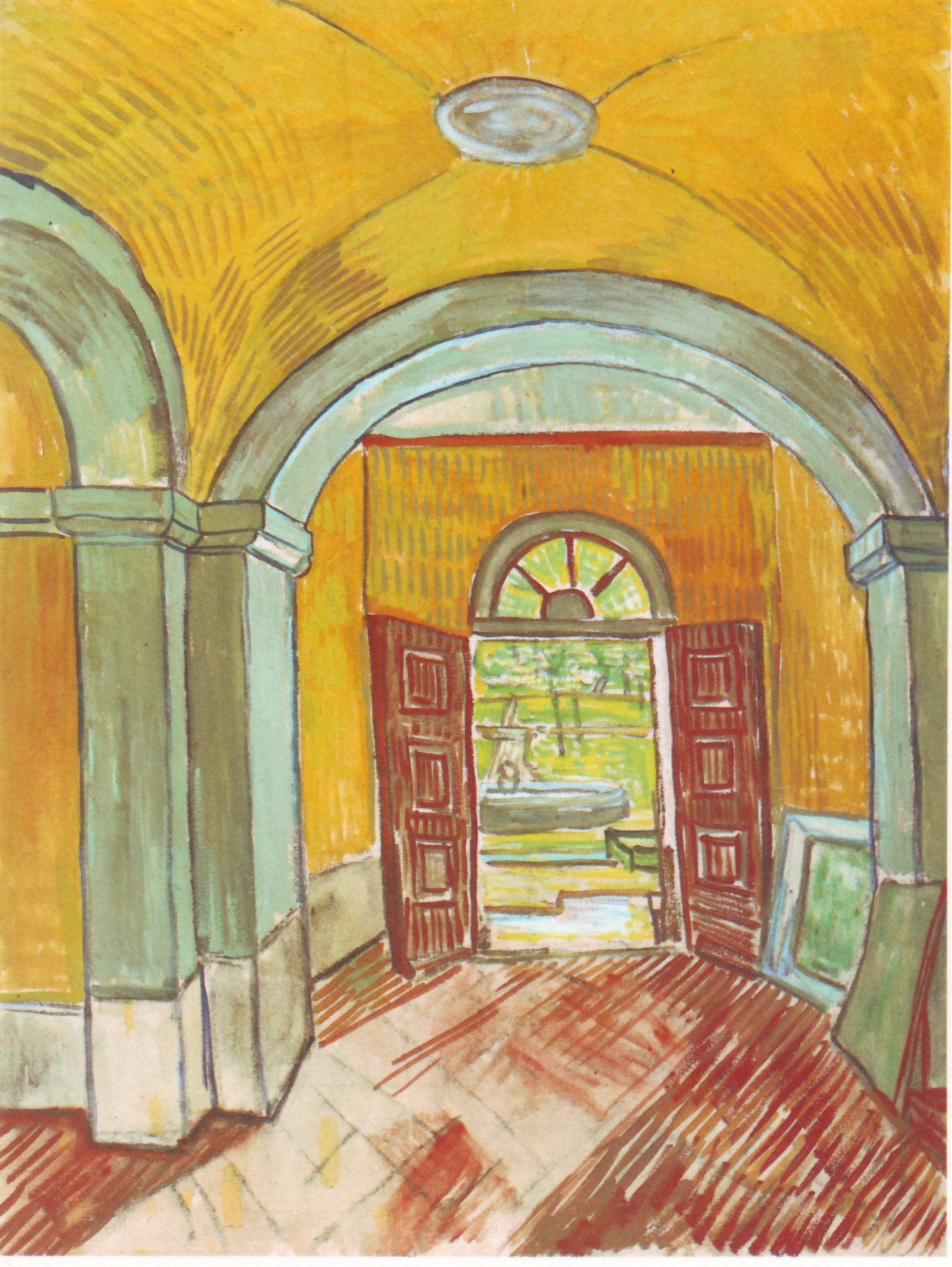
Entrance Hall of Saint-Paul Hospital, Black chalk, brush and thinned oil on pink paper,
1889
Van Gogh Museum, Amsterdam (F1530)

=== Corner of Saint-Paul Hospital ===
Van Gogh completed two versions of the corner of Saint-Remy hospital gardens. Van Gogh was descriptive in a letter to Émile Bernard of the setting for these paintings:

"A view of the garden of the asylum where I am, on the right a gray terrace, a section the house, some rosebushes that have lost their flowers; on the left, the earth of the garden – red ochre – earth burnt by the sun, covered in fallen pine twigs. This edge of the garden is planted with large pines with red ochre trunks and branches, with green foliage saddened by a mixture of black. These tall trees stand out against an evening sky streaked with violet against a yellow background. High up, the yellow turns to pink, turns to green. A wall – red ocher again – blocks the view, and there’s nothing above it but a violet and yellow ochre hill. Now, the first tree is an enormous trunk, but struck by lightning and sawn off. A side branch, thrusts up very high, however, and falls down again in an avalanche of dark green twigs. This dark giant – like a proud man brought low – contrasts, when seen as the character of a living being, with the pale smile of the last rose on the bush, which is fading in front of him. Under the trees, empty stone benches, dark box. The sky is reflected yellow in a puddle after the rain. A ray of sun – the last glimmer – exalts the dark ocher to orange – small dark figures prowl here and there between the trunks."

"You’ll understand that this combination of red ochre, of green saddened with grey, of black lines that define the outlines, this gives rise a little to the feeling of anxiety from which some of my companions in misfortune often suffer, and which is called 'seeing red'." And what's more, the motif of the great tree struck by lightning, the sickly pink and green smile of the last flower of autumn, confirms this idea.

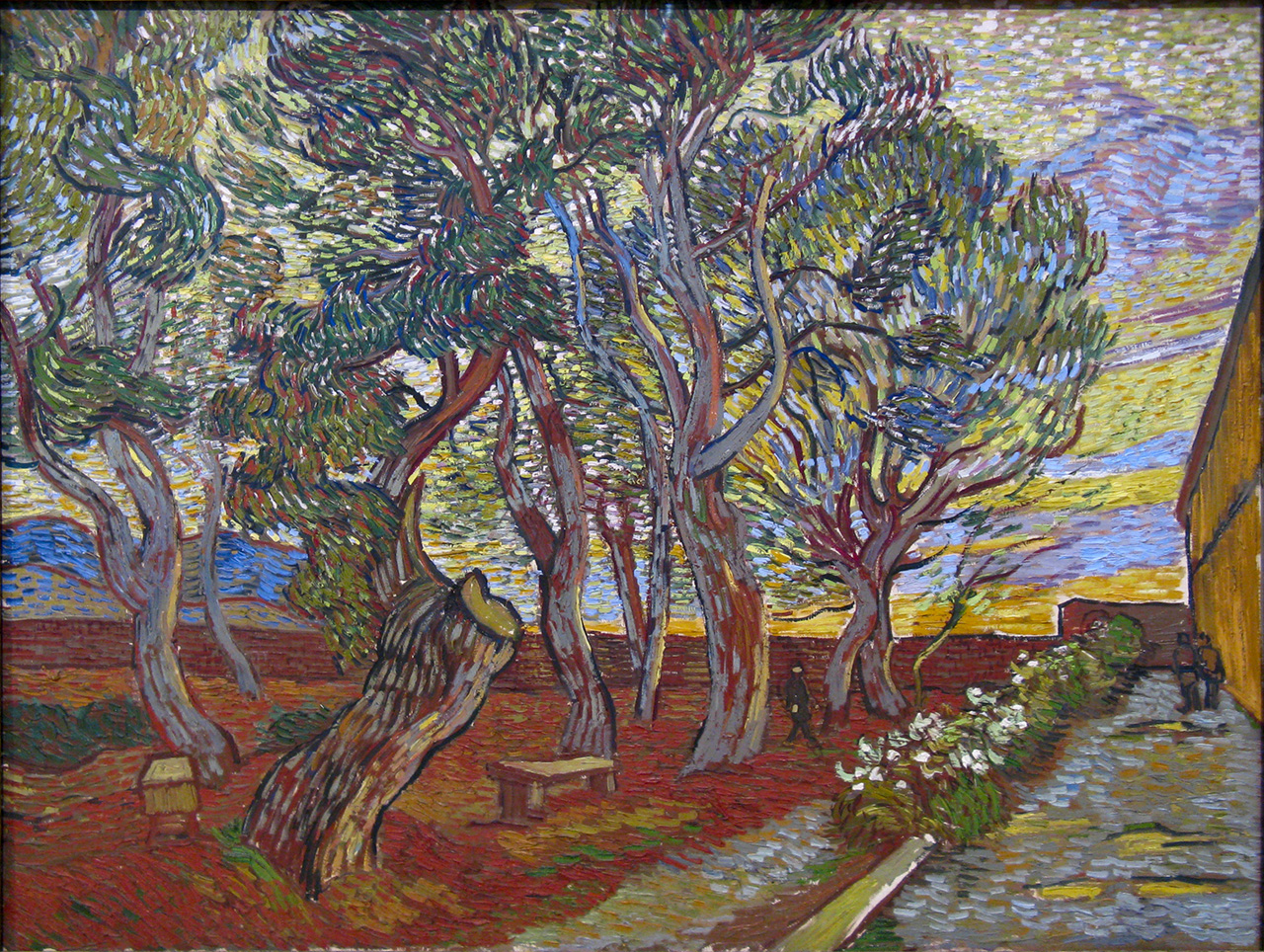
The Garden of Saint-Paul Hospital
October 1889
Van Gogh Museum, Amsterdam
(F659)

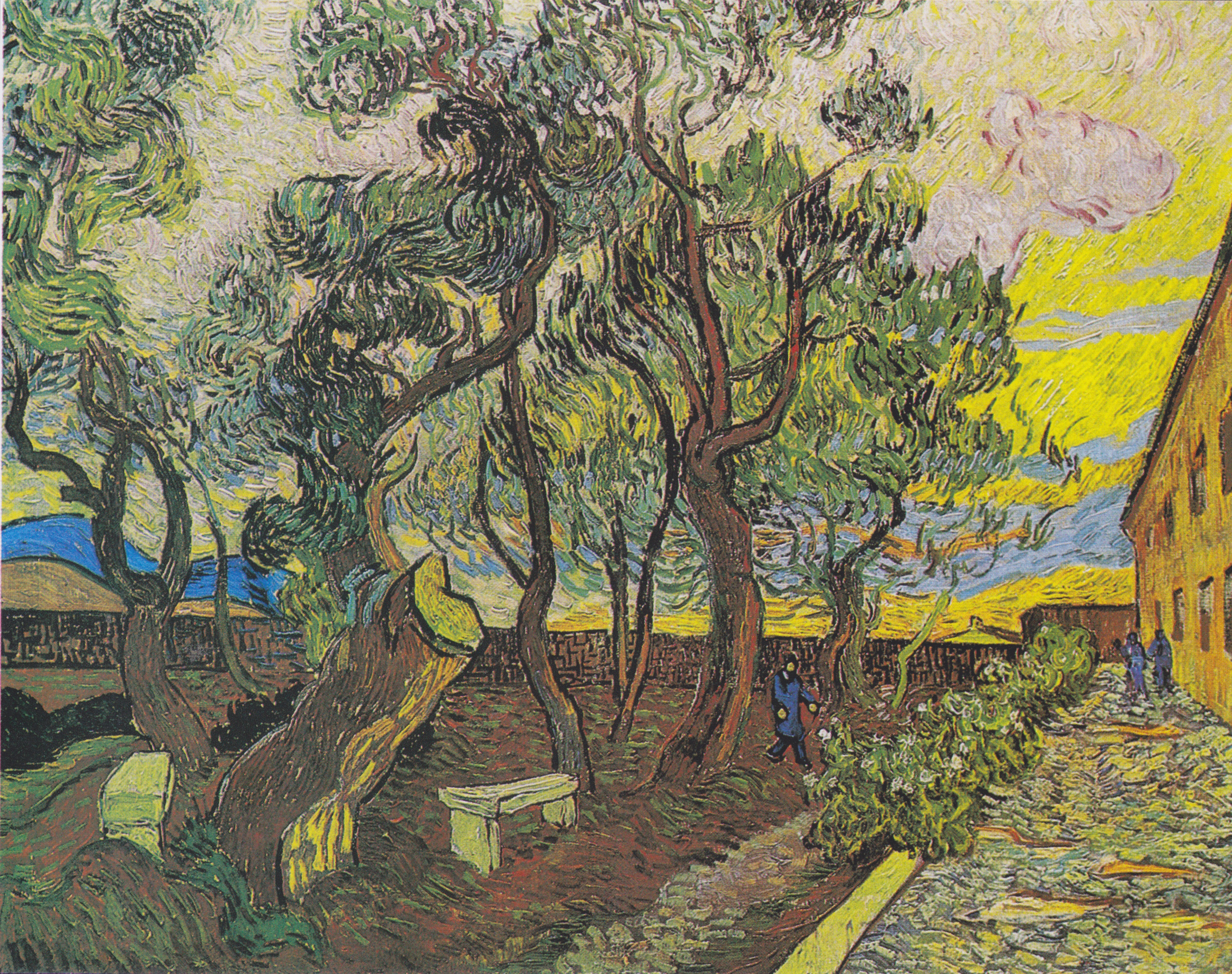
A Corner of Saint-Paul Hospital and the Garden with a Heavy, Sawed-Off Tree
1889
Museum Folkwang, Essen, Germany (F660)

== The garden ==
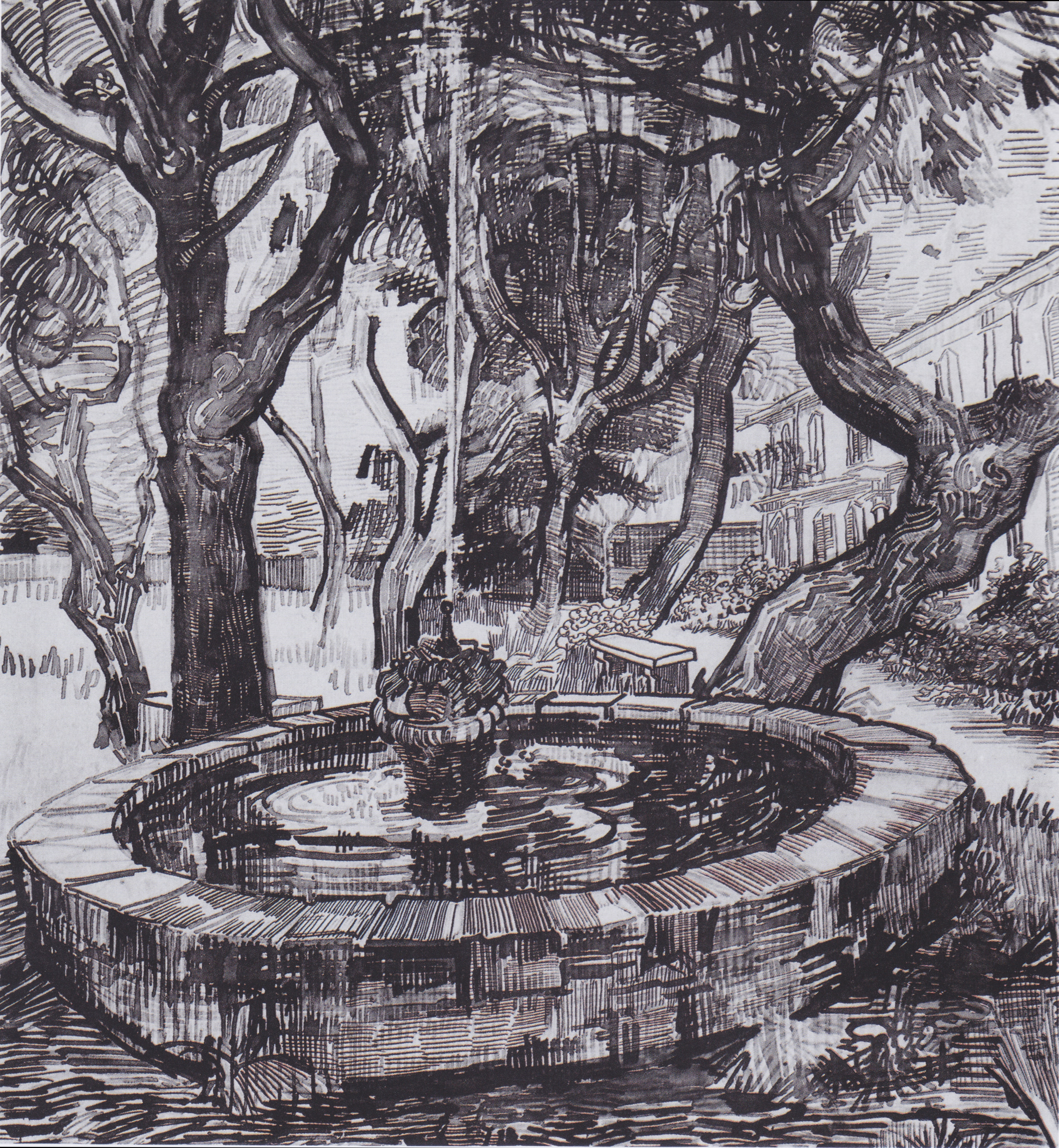
Fountain in the Garden of the Hospital Saint-Paul, Black chalk, reed pen and ink, May 1889, Van Gogh Museum, Amsterdam (F1531)

One year before coming to Saint-Rémy van Gogh wrote of a visit to an old garden, which shed light both on his interest in gardens and connection to their restorative effect: "If it had been bigger it would have made me think of Zola’s Paradou, great reeds, vines, ivy, fig trees, olive trees, pomegranates with lusty flowers of the brightest orange, hundred-year-old cypresses, ash trees and willows, rock oaks, half-demolished flights of steps, ogive windows in ruins, blocks of white rock covered in lichen and scattered fragments of collapsed walls here and there among the greenery." Van Gogh gave reference to Émile Zola’s La Faute de l'Abbé Mouret, an 1875 novel about a monk who finds solace in an overgrown garden where he is nursed back to health by a young woman.

For the first month of van Gogh's stay he could not leave the grounds of the hospital, so he looked to the garden where he painted flowers and trees. To his brother, Theo, he wrote, "When you receive the canvases that I have done in the garden, you will see that I am not too melancholy here."

In the first week in October van Gogh made several paintings, such as The Mulberry Tree, The Reaper, and Entrance to a Quarry. He also made a painting of trees in the courtyard that he seemed proud of; he wrote, "I have two views of the gardens and the asylum in which this place looks very attractive. I’ve tried to reconstruct it as it might have been, simplifying and accentuating the proud, unchanging nature of the pine trees and the clumps of cedar against the blue."

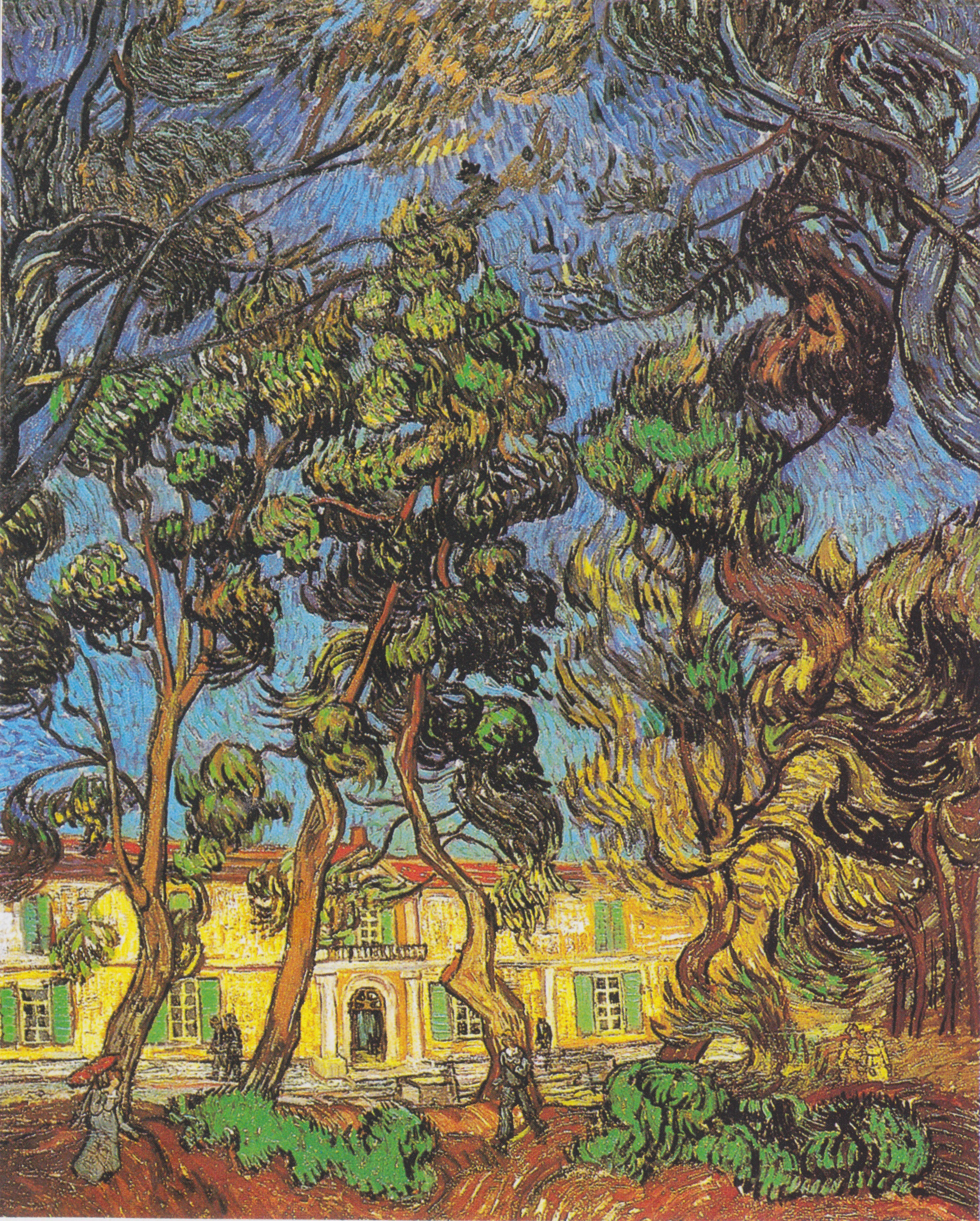
Trees in the Garden in Front of the Entrance to Saint-Paul Hospital
1889
Armand Hammer Museum of Art and Cultural Center, Los Angeles, California (F643)

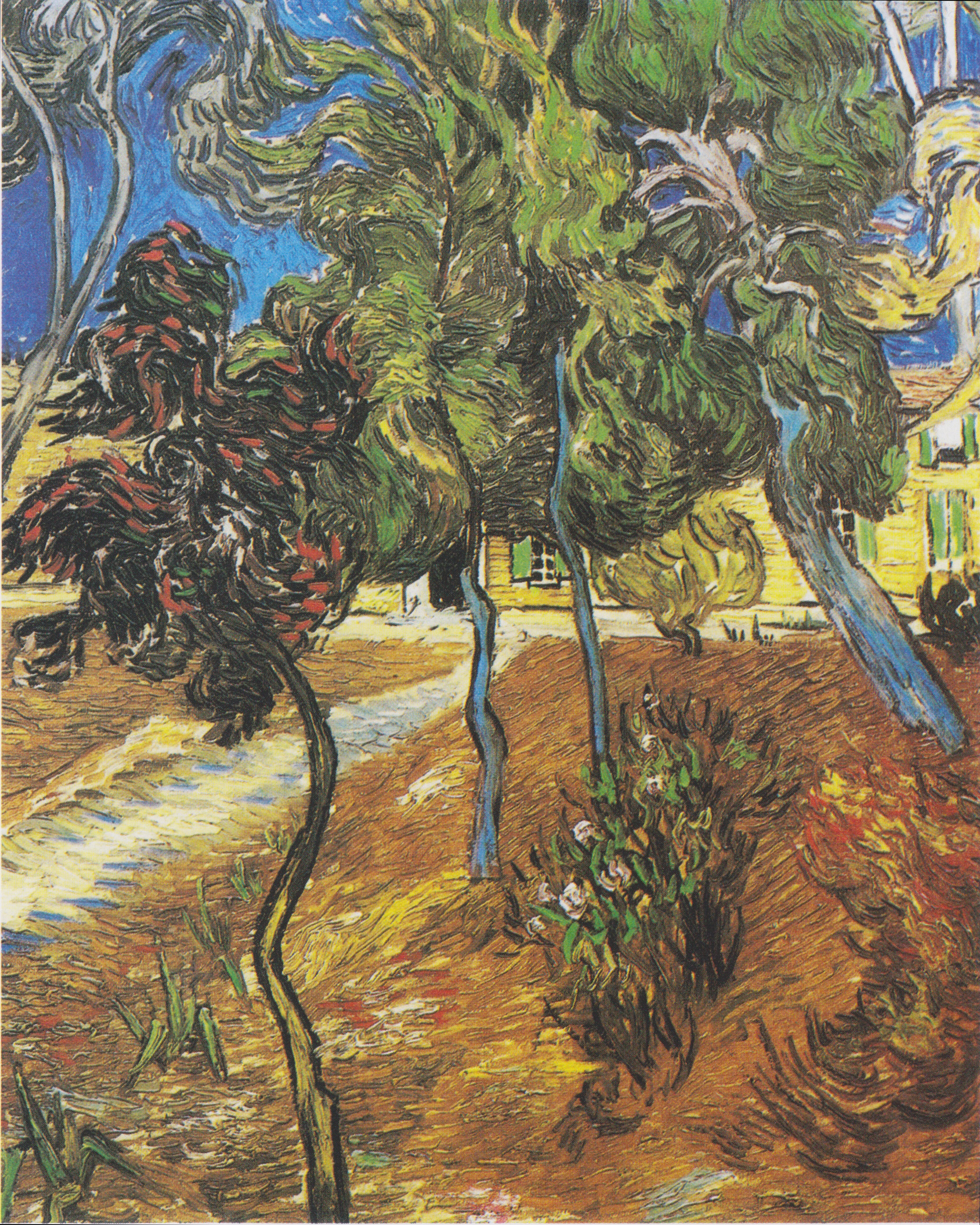
Trees in the Garden of the Hospital Saint-Paul
1889
Private Collection (F642)

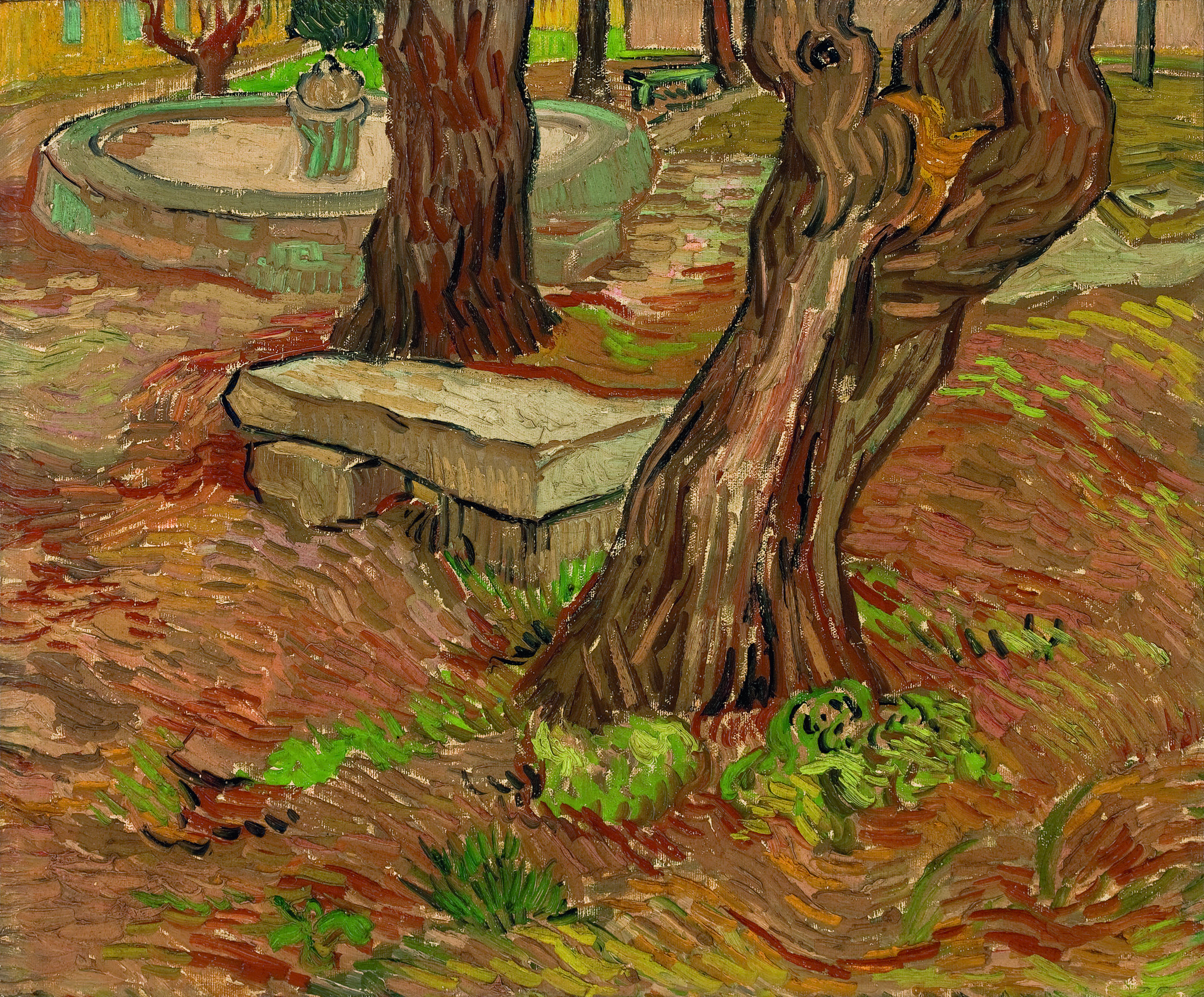
Stone Bench in the Garden of Saint-Paul Hospital
1889
São Paulo Museum of Art, Brazil (F732)

Van Gogh also made Flowering Rosebushes in the Asylum Garden also called Flowering Shrub that resides at Kröller-Müller Museum, Otterlo, Netherlands (F1527).

=== The Garden of Saint-Paul Hospital ===
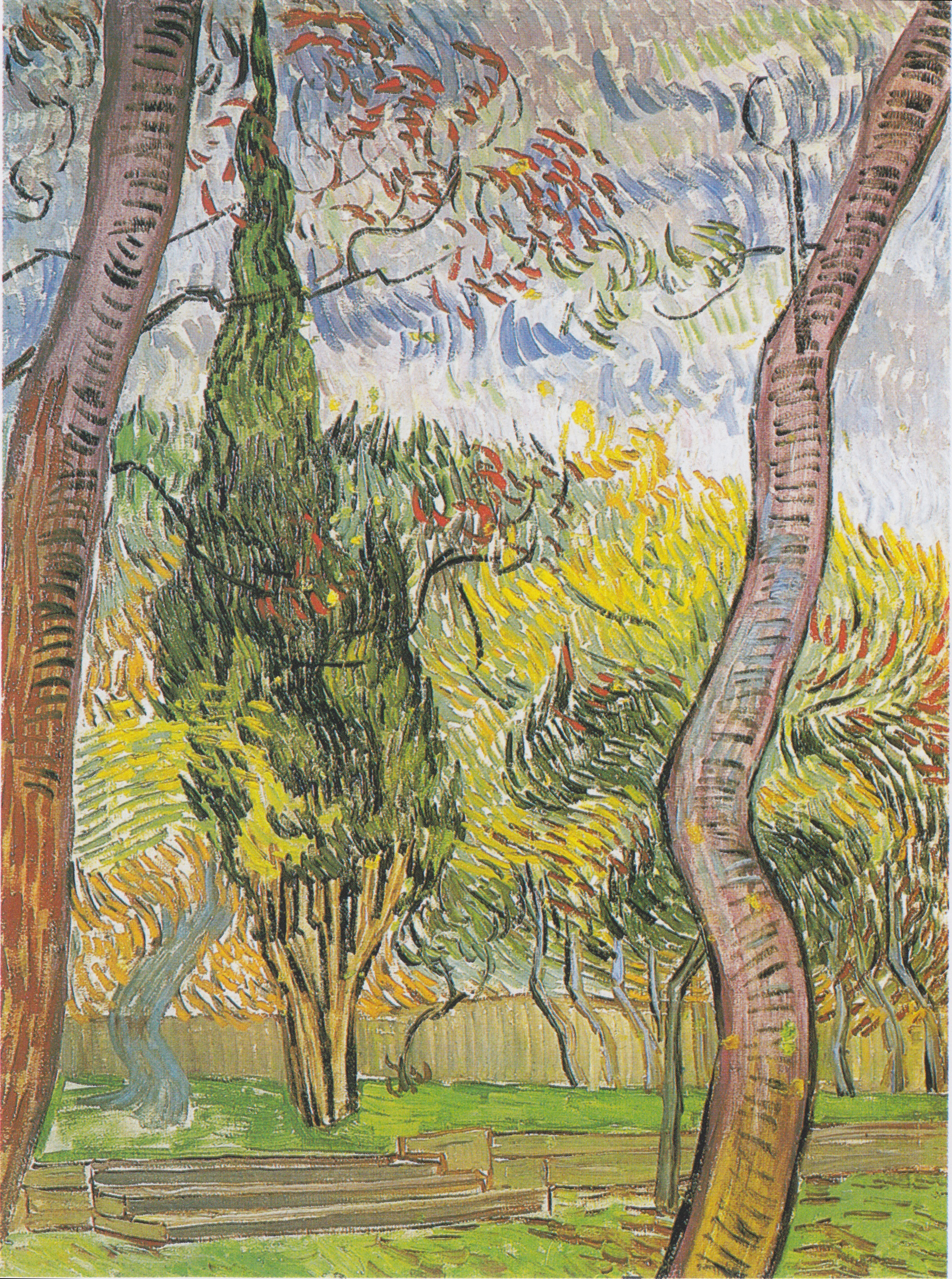
The Garden of Saint-Paul Hospital
October 1889
Private Collection (F640)

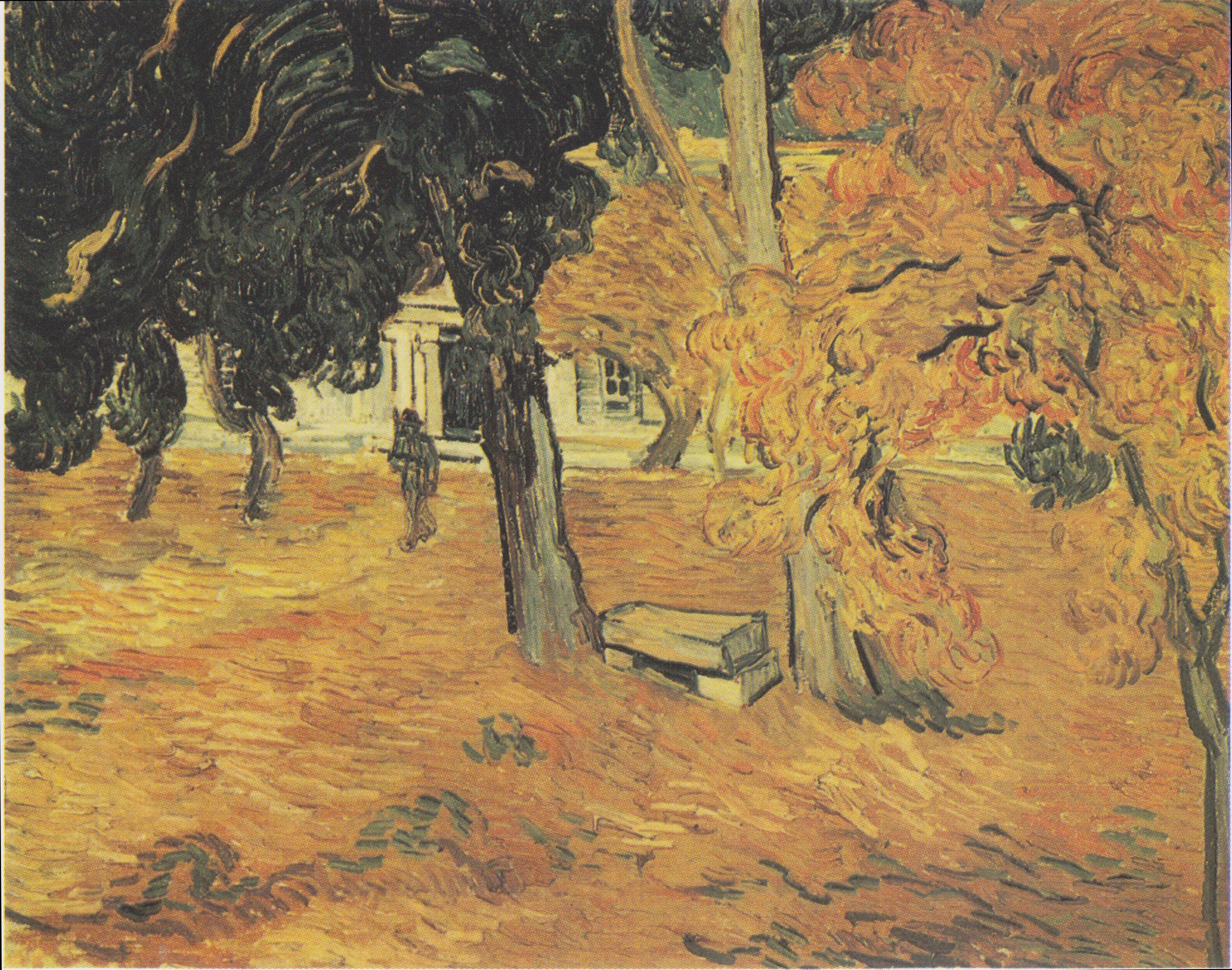
The Garden of Saint-Paul Hospital
October 1889
Private Collection (F730)

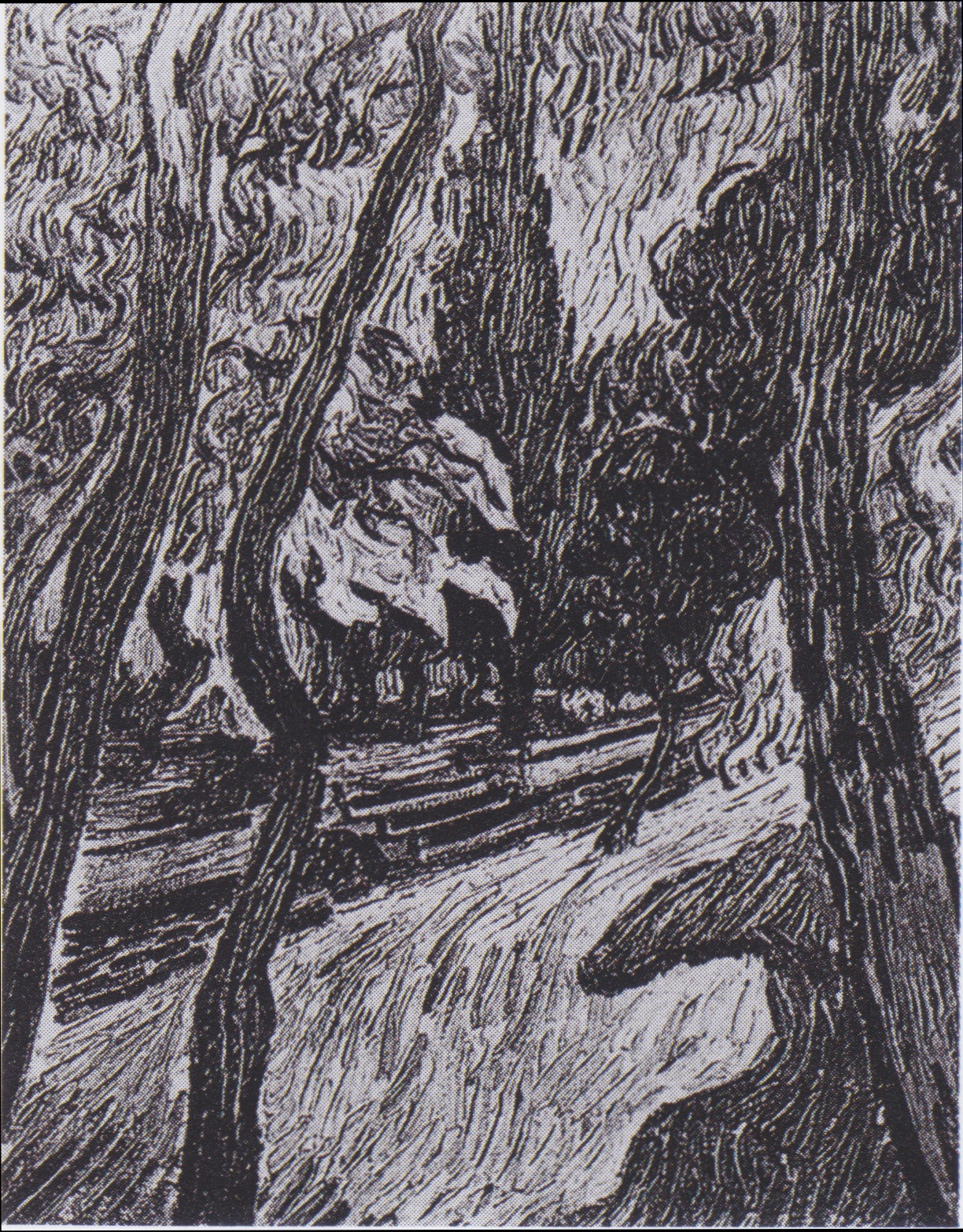
Trees in the Garden of Saint-Paul Hospital
October 1889
Private Collection (F731)

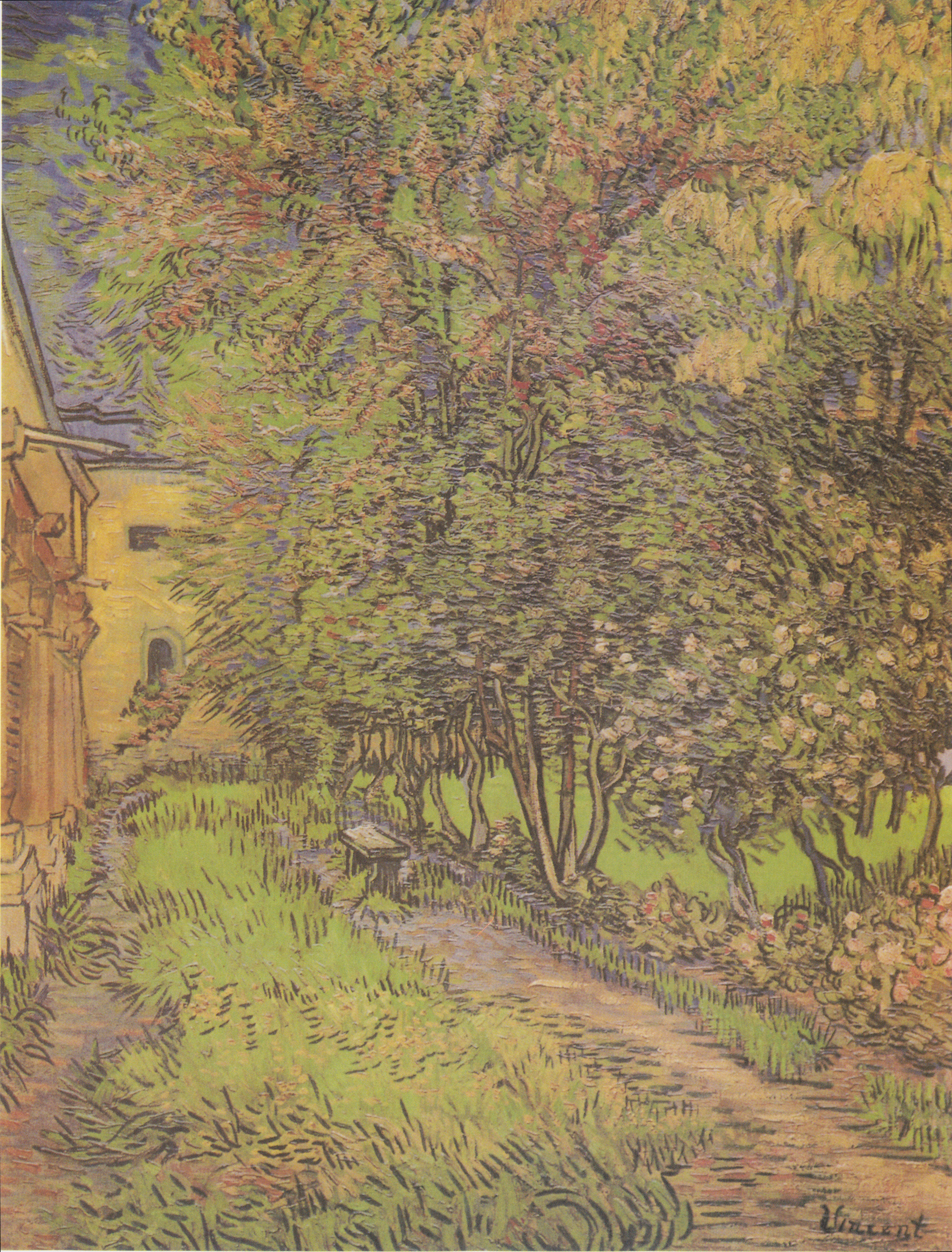
The Garden of Saint-Paul Hospital
May 1889
Kröller-Müller Museum, Otterlo (F734)

=== Pine Trees ===
Although December was a cold month, van Gogh worked in the garden producing studies of pine trees in a storm and other work.

Van Gogh may have given Pine Trees with Figure in the Garden of Saint-Paul Hospital to Doctor Joseph Peyron; his name is the first in the provenance for the work.

Pine Trees and Dandelions includes "a pine trunk, pink and purple, and then the grass with some white flowers and dandelions, a little rose bush and some other tree trunks in the background right at the top of the canvas," van Gogh wrote in a letter to his brother in May 1890.

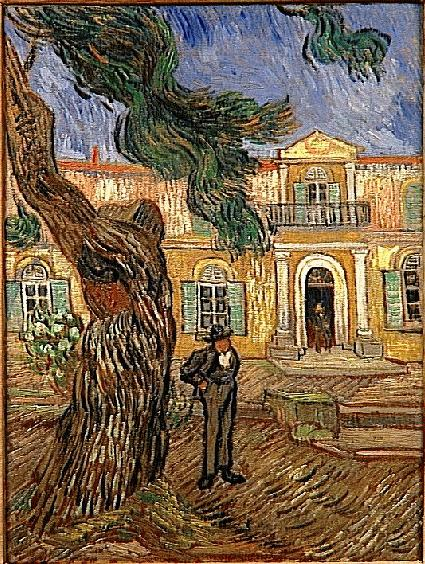
Pine Trees with Figure in the Garden of Saint-Paul Hospital
1889
Musée d'Orsay, Paris, France (F653)

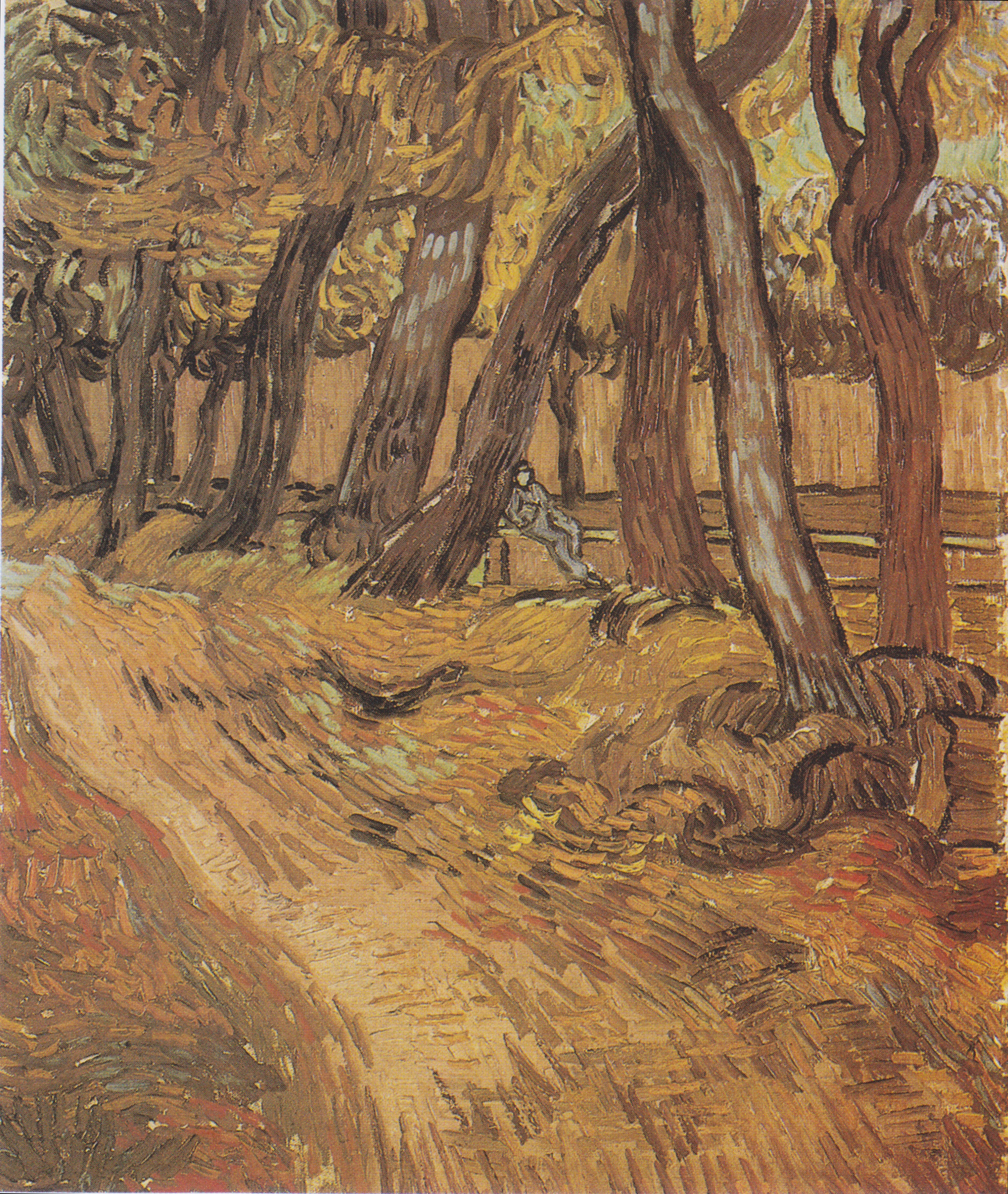
Path in Pine Trees with Figure in the Garden of Saint-Paul Hospital
1889
Kröller-Müller Museum, Otterlo, Netherlands (F733)

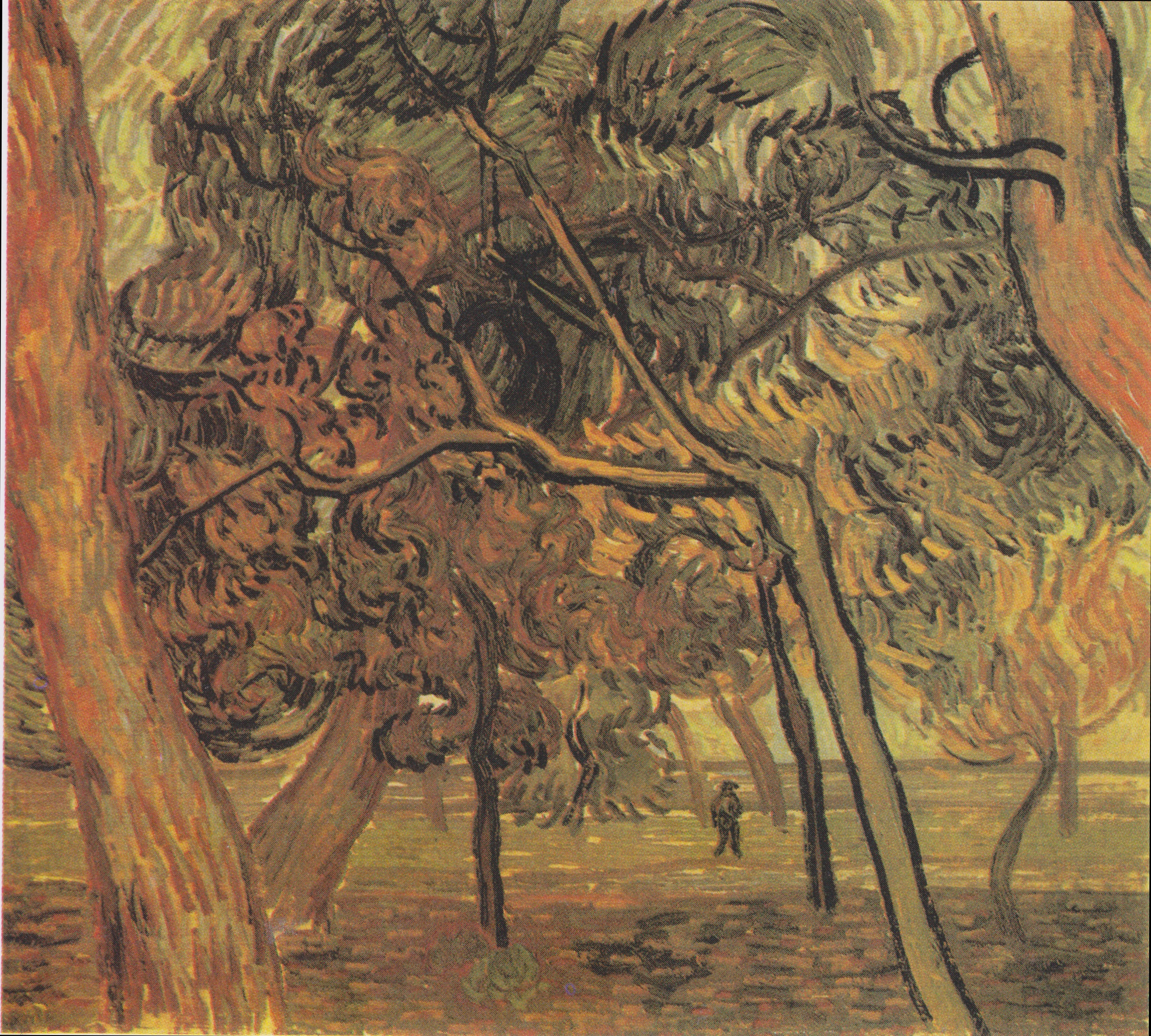
Study of Pine Trees appears to be within the walled Saint-Paul
1889
Kröller-Müller Museum, Otterlo, Netherlands (F742)

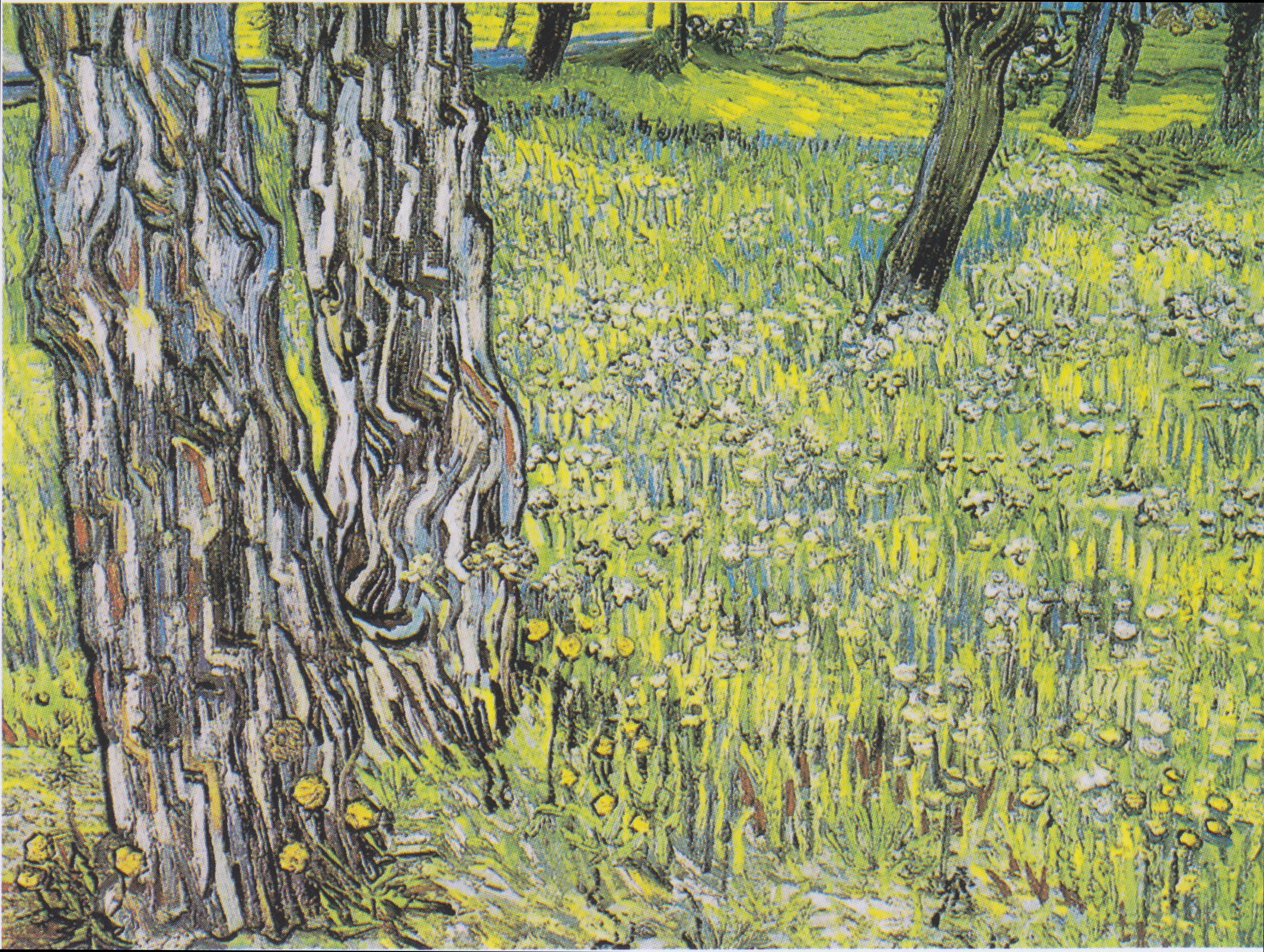
Pine Trees and Dandelions in the Garden of Saint-Paul Hospital
April–May 1890
Kröller-Müller Museum, Otterlo (676)

=== Trees and Undergrowth ===
Van Gogh explored the grounds of the asylum where he found an overgrown garden. He wrote, "since I have been here, I have had enough work with the overgrown garden with its large pine trees, under which there grows tall and poorly-tended grass, mixed with all kinds of periwinkle." The paintings are of growth below ivy covered trees.

Of the first of painting (F745), Van Gogh Museum comments, "The effect of light and shade created an almost abstract pattern, with small arcs of paint covering the entire surface of the canvas." The second (F746), also of undergrowth beneath trees, is made with small brushstrokes to create a blurred image that also shows the effect of light shining through the shaded trees.

Ivy, originally Le Lierre is a painting van Gogh made May 1889. Van Gogh incorporated the first version in his selection of works to be displayed at Les XX, Brussels, in 1890.

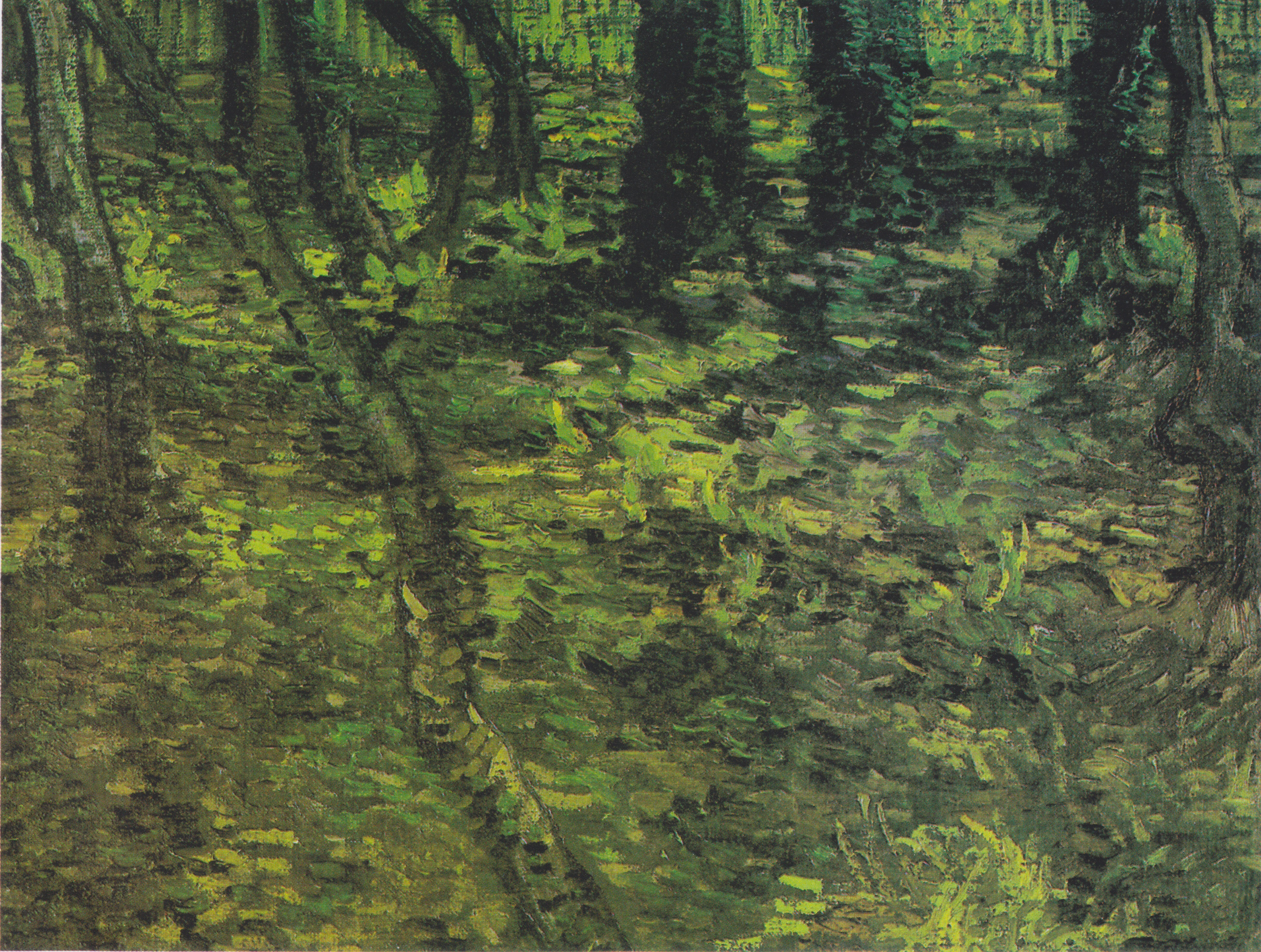
Undergrowth with Ivy
July 1889
Van Gogh Museum, Amsterdam (F745)

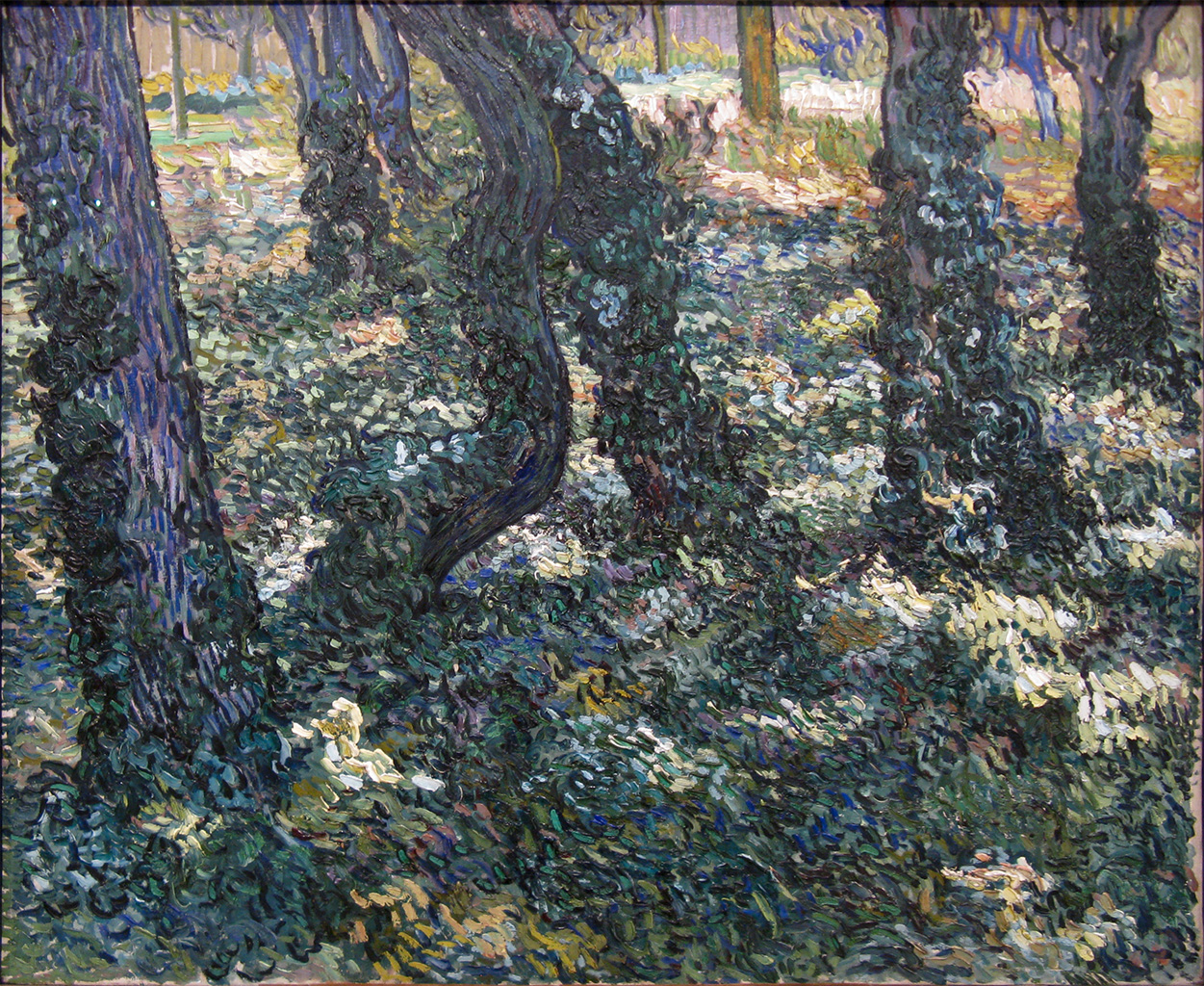
Undergrowth with Ivy
July 1889
Van Gogh Museum, Amsterdam (F746)

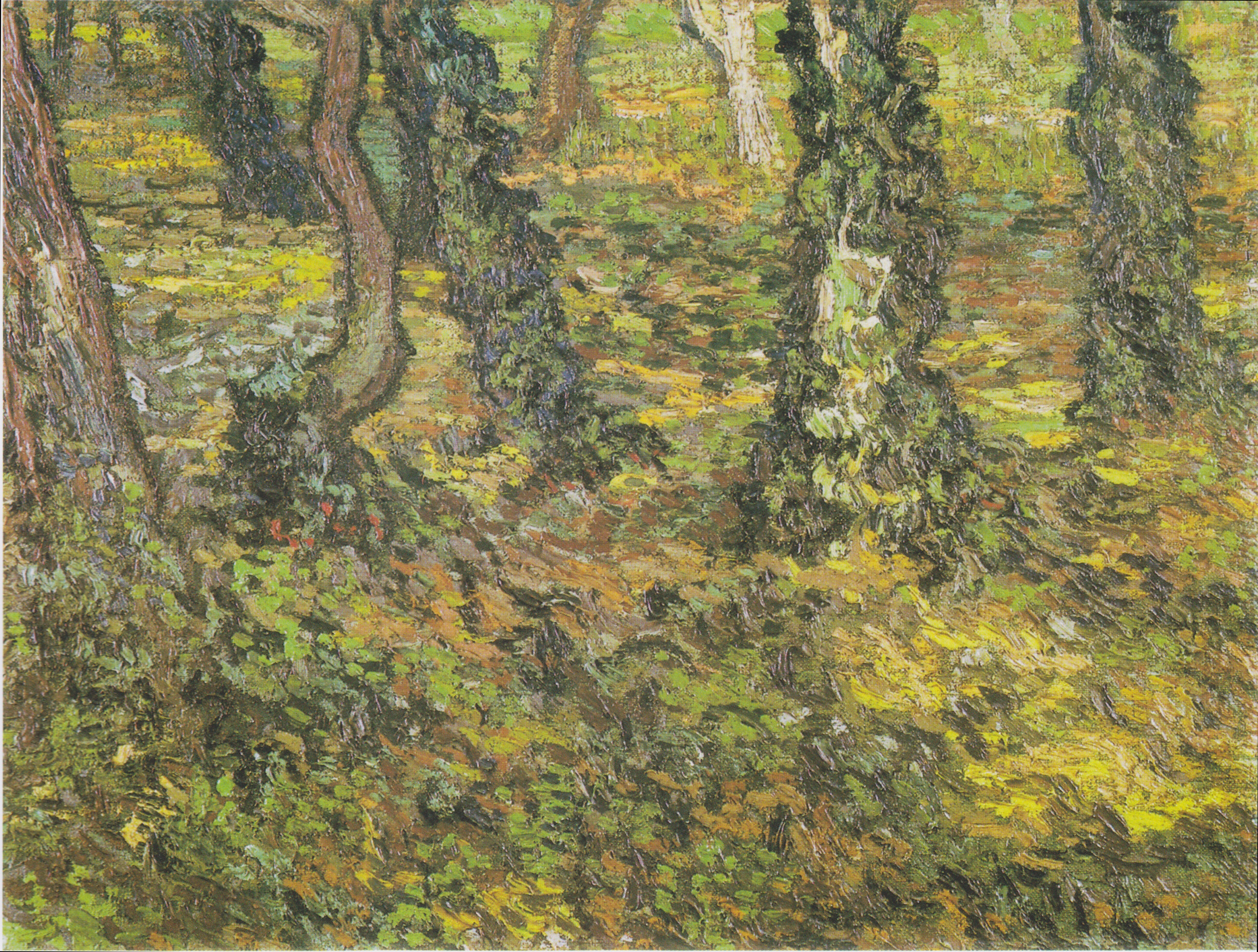
Tree Trunks with Ivy
1889
Kröller-Müller Museum, Otterlo, Netherlands (F747)

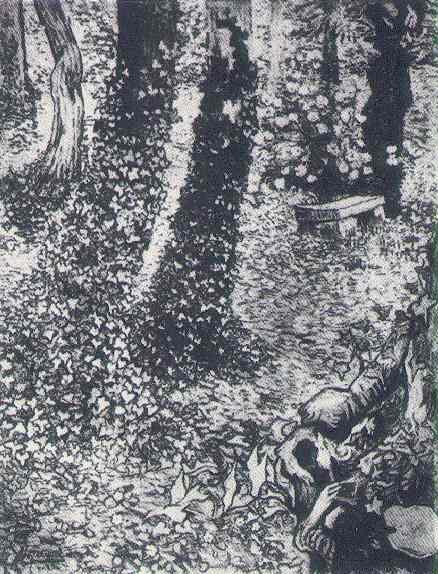
Ivy (Corner in the Garden of Saint-Paul Hospital), 1889, 92 × 72 cm, Location unknown (F609)

=== Flowers ===
As the end of his stay in Saint-Rémy and the days ahead in Auvers-sur-Oise neared, van Gogh conveyed his optimism and enthusiasm by painting flowers. About the time that van Gogh painted this work, he wrote to his mother, "But for one's health, as you say, it is very necessary to work in the garden and see the flowers growing." To his sister Wil he wrote, "The last days in Saint-Rémy I worked like a madman. Great bouquets of flowers, violet-colored irises, great bouquets of roses."

==== Irises ====
Van Gogh made Irises from the irises in the asylum's garden. The painting seems influenced by Japanese ukiyo-e woodblock prints due to its close-up views, large areas of bright color and irises appearing to overflow the borders of the frame. He considered this painting a study, which is probably why there are no known drawings for it, although Theo, van Gogh's brother, thought better of it and quickly submitted it to the annual exhibition of the Société des Artistes Indépendants in September 1889. He wrote to Vincent of the exhibition: "[It] strikes the eye from afar. The Irises are a beautiful study full of air and life."

A single iris is the subject of the second painting, smartly posed in the center. Like rays of the sun, brush strokes radiate out from the plant. Iris, with one full bloom, may have been painted before Irises that was filled with blooms.

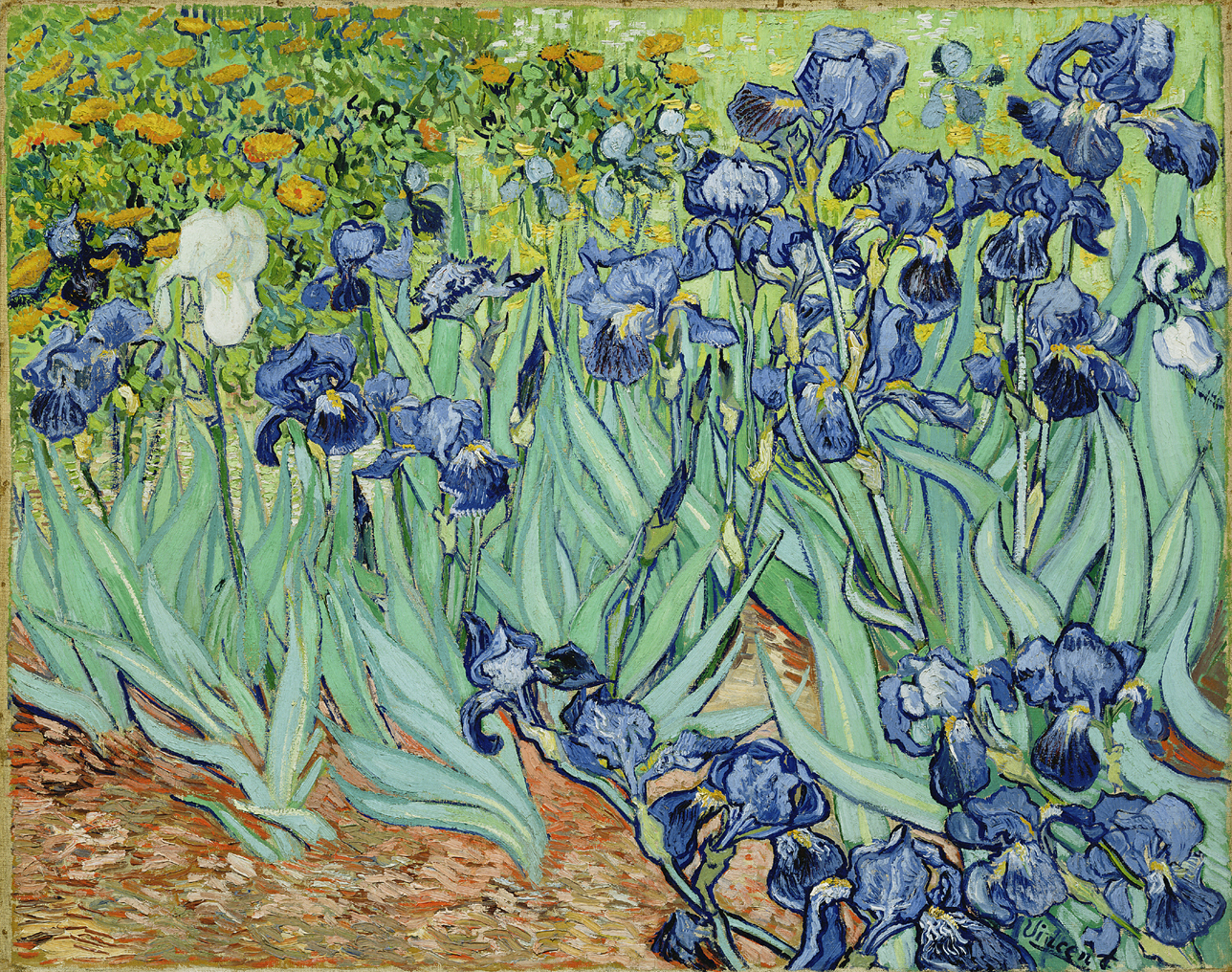
Irises
1889
J. Paul Getty Museum, Los Angeles, California (F608)

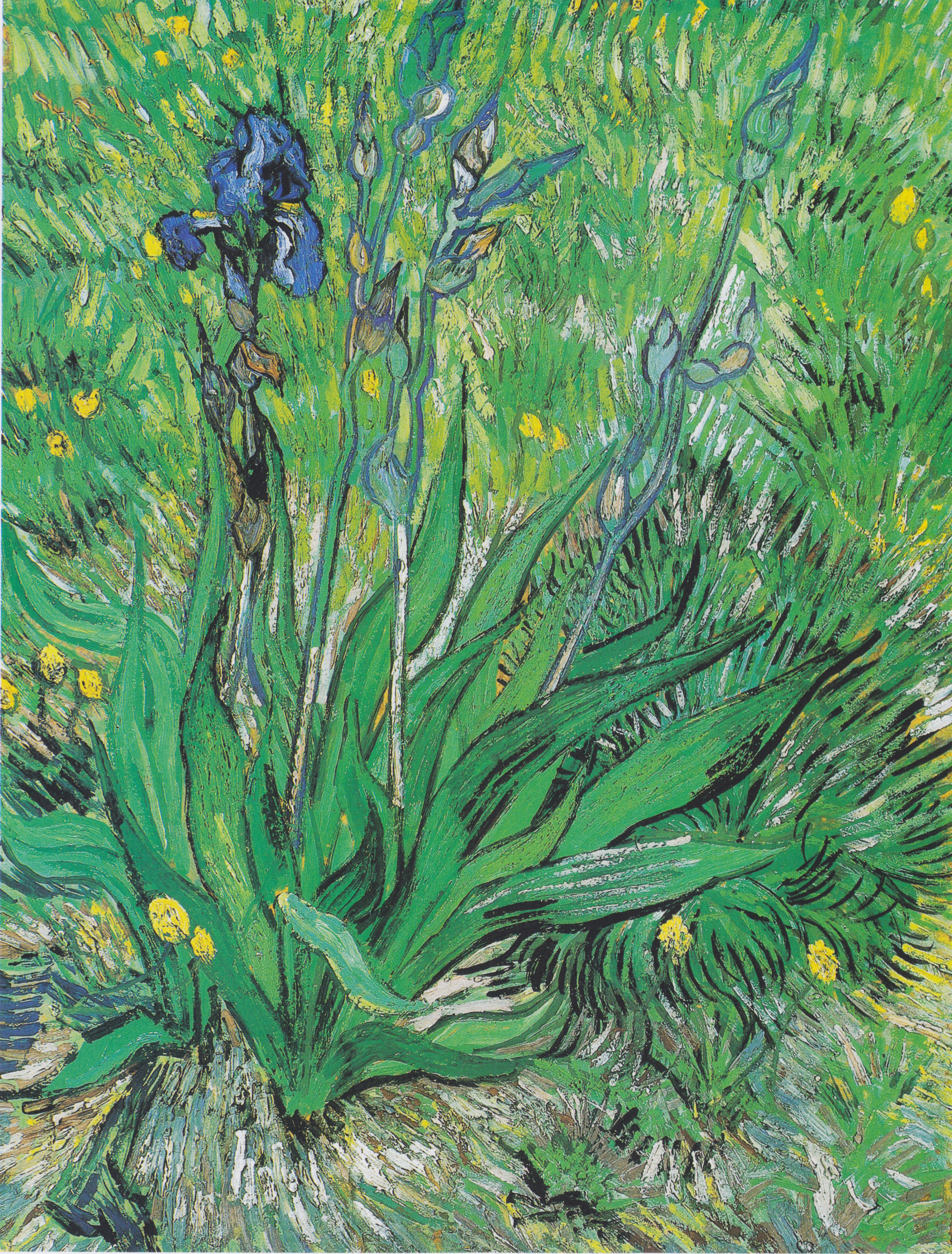
The Iris
May 1889
National Gallery of Canada, Ottawa (F601)

==== Roses ====
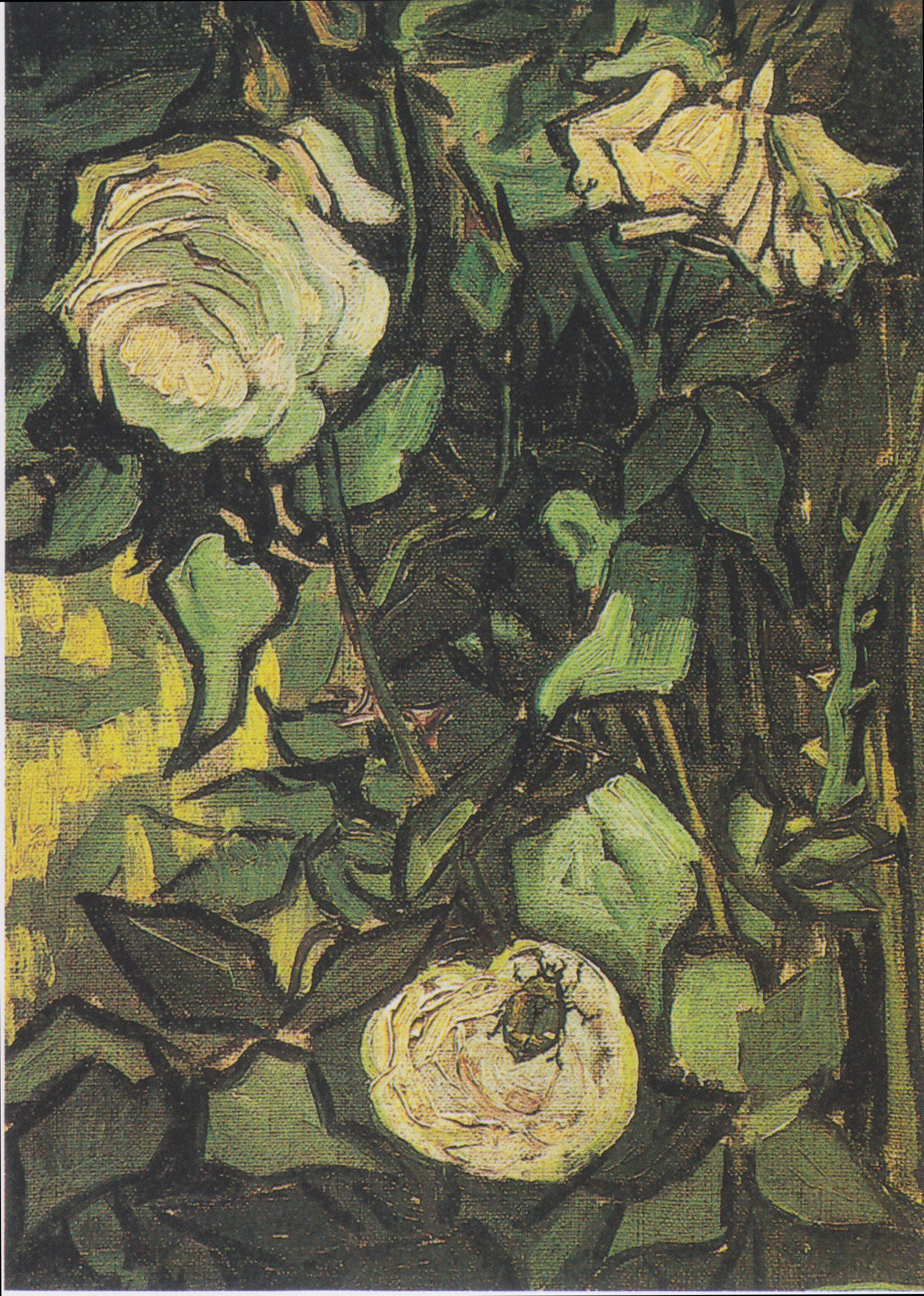
Roses and Beetle
April–May 1890
Van Gogh Museum, Amsterdam (F749)

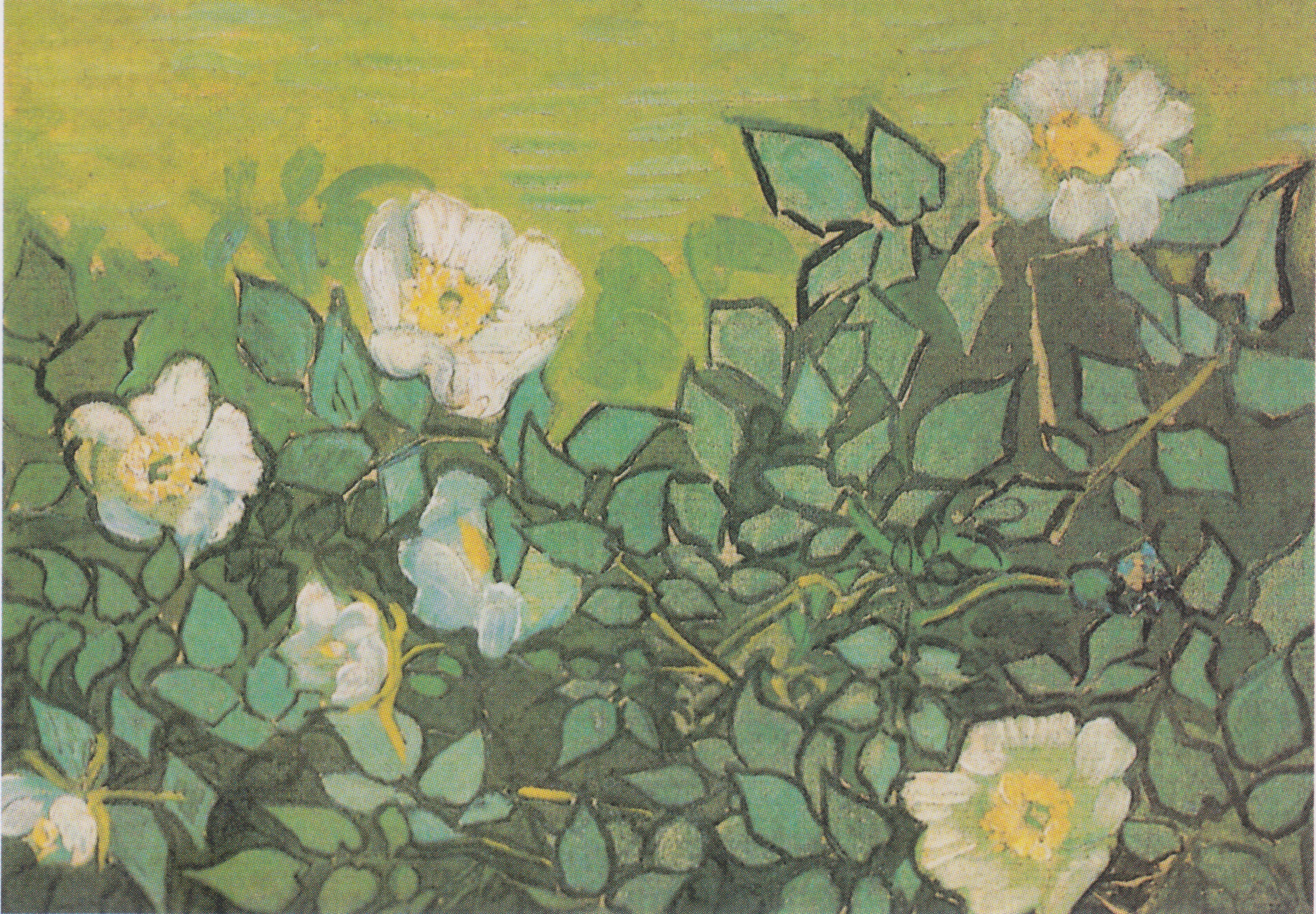
Wild Roses
April–May 1890
Van Gogh Museum, Amsterdam (F597)

==== Lilacs ====
When van Gogh worked on the Irises, he was also working on Lilacs, both from the garden. The Hermitage Museum, holder of this painting, describes it, "Van Gogh depicted a lilac bush in the hospital gardens, the broken, separate brushstrokes and vibrant forms recalling the lessons of Impressionism, yet with a spatial dynamism unknown to the Impressionists. This bush is full of powerful, vivid energy and dramatic expression. The modest natural motif is transformed by the master's temperament and the brilliance of his emotions. Embodied here in this fragment of an overgrown garden we find all of nature's life-giving forces. In rejecting Impressionism, Van Gogh created his own artistic language, expressing the artist's romantic, passionate and deeply dramatic perception of the world."

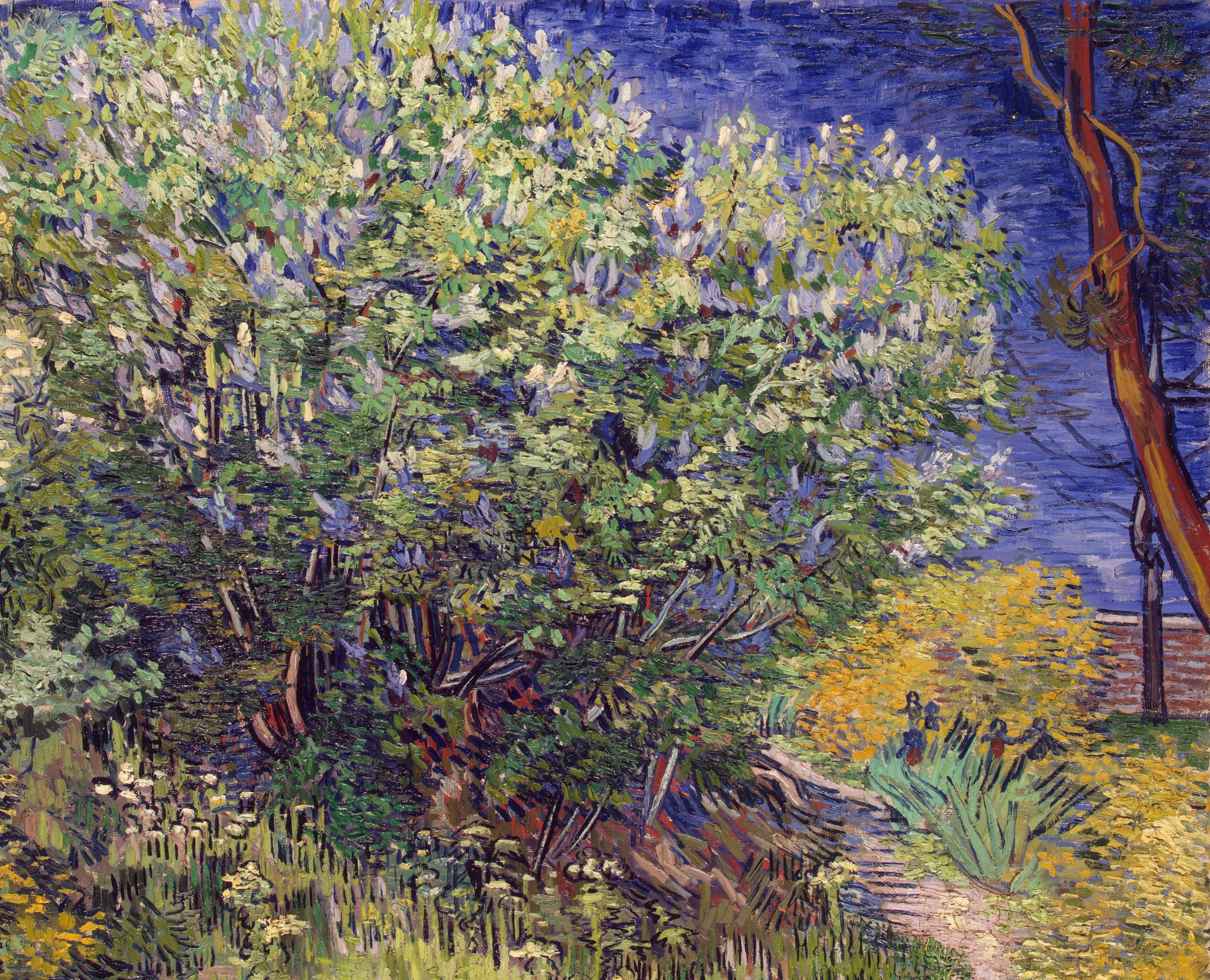
Lilacs
May 1889
Hermitage Museum, St. Petersburg, Russia (F579)

=== Floral still life ===
Van Gogh had not painted still life during his stay at Saint-Rémy until the very last month of his year-long stay when he painted four striking bouquets of irises and roses. To his sister Wil he wrote, "The last days in Saint-Rémy I worked like a madman. Great bouquets of flowers, violet-colored irises, great bouquets of roses." Van Gogh's mother owned both upright versions of the irises and roses paintings held by the Metropolitan Museum of Art until her death in 1907.

==== Vase with Irises ====
In one of the iris paintings he places the large bunch of violet irises against a harmonious pink background. Unfortunately, over time, the pink background has faded to almost white. In the other, he use a contrasting yellow background.

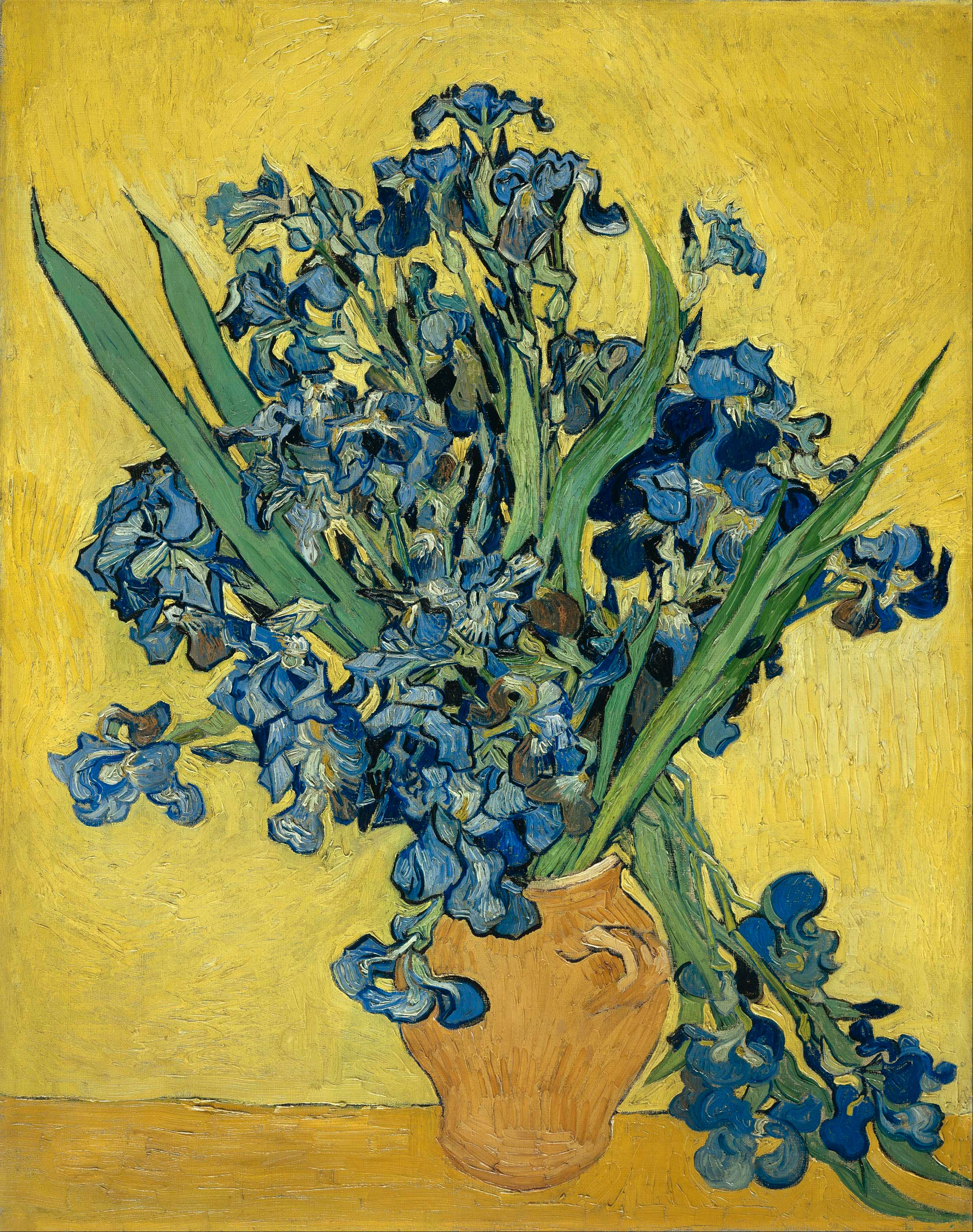
Still Life: Vase with Irises Against a Yellow Background
May 1890
Van Gogh Museum, Amsterdam (F678)

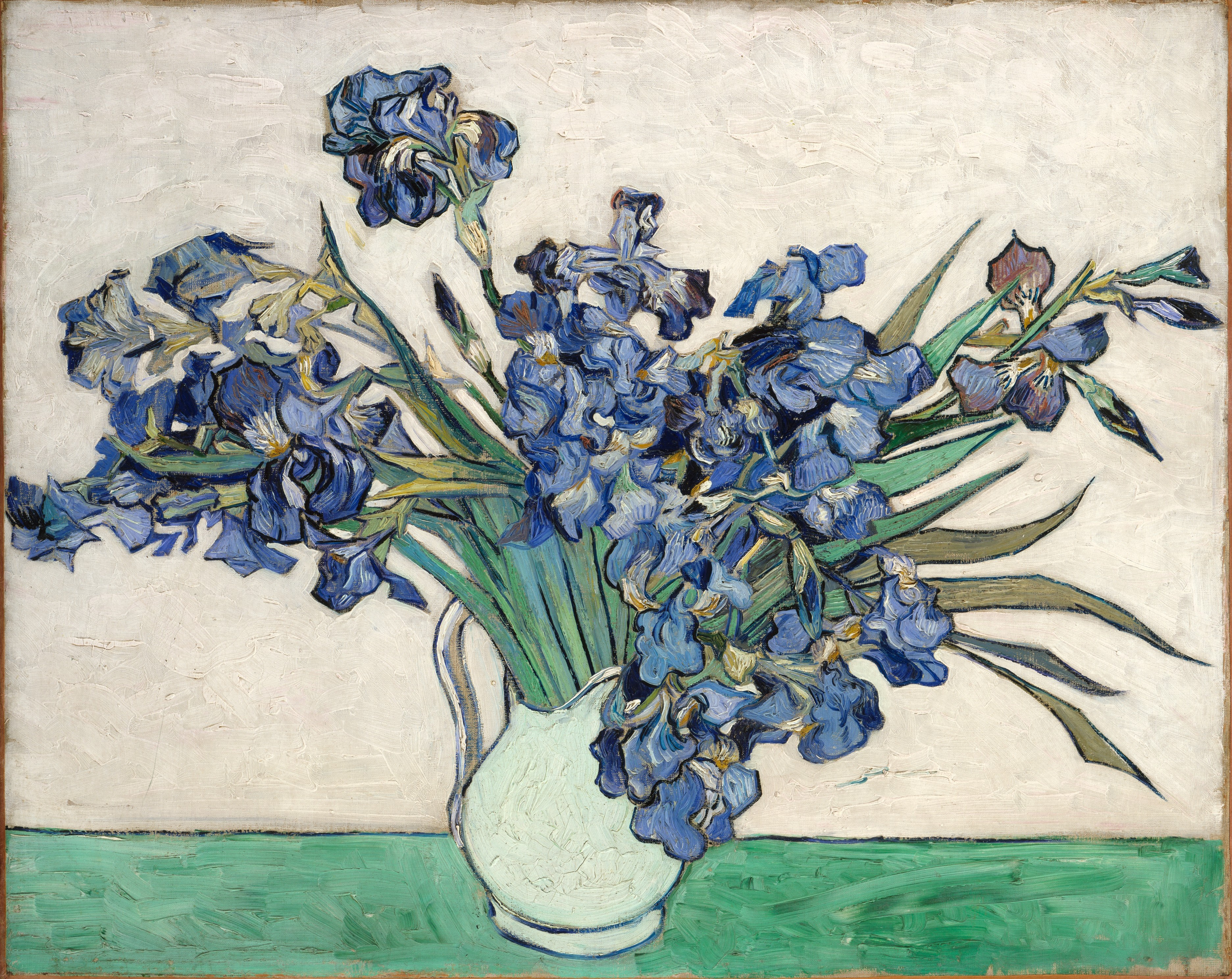
Still Life: Vase with Irises
May 1890
The Metropolitan Museum of Art, New York (F680)

==== Vase with Roses ====
Van Gogh painted Still Life: Vase with Pink Roses shortly before his release from the Saint-Rémy asylum. As the end of his stay in Saint-Rémy and the days ahead in Auvers-sur-Oise neared, van Gogh conveyed his optimism and enthusiasm by painting flowers. About the time that van Gogh painted this work, he wrote to his mother, "But for one's health, as you say, it is very necessary to work in the garden and see the flowers growing."

The National Gallery of Art describes the painting, "The undulating ribbons of paint, applied in diagonal strokes, animate the canvas and play-off the furled forms of flowers and leaves. Originally, the roses were pink—the color has faded—and would have created a contrast of complementary colors with the green." The exuberant bouquets of roses is said to be one of van Gogh's largest, most beautiful still life paintings. Van Gogh made another painting of roses in Saint-Rémy, which is on display at the Metropolitan Museum of Art in New York City.

Still Life: Vase with Pink Roses (Van Gogh)
May 1890
National Gallery of Art, Washington D.C. (F681)

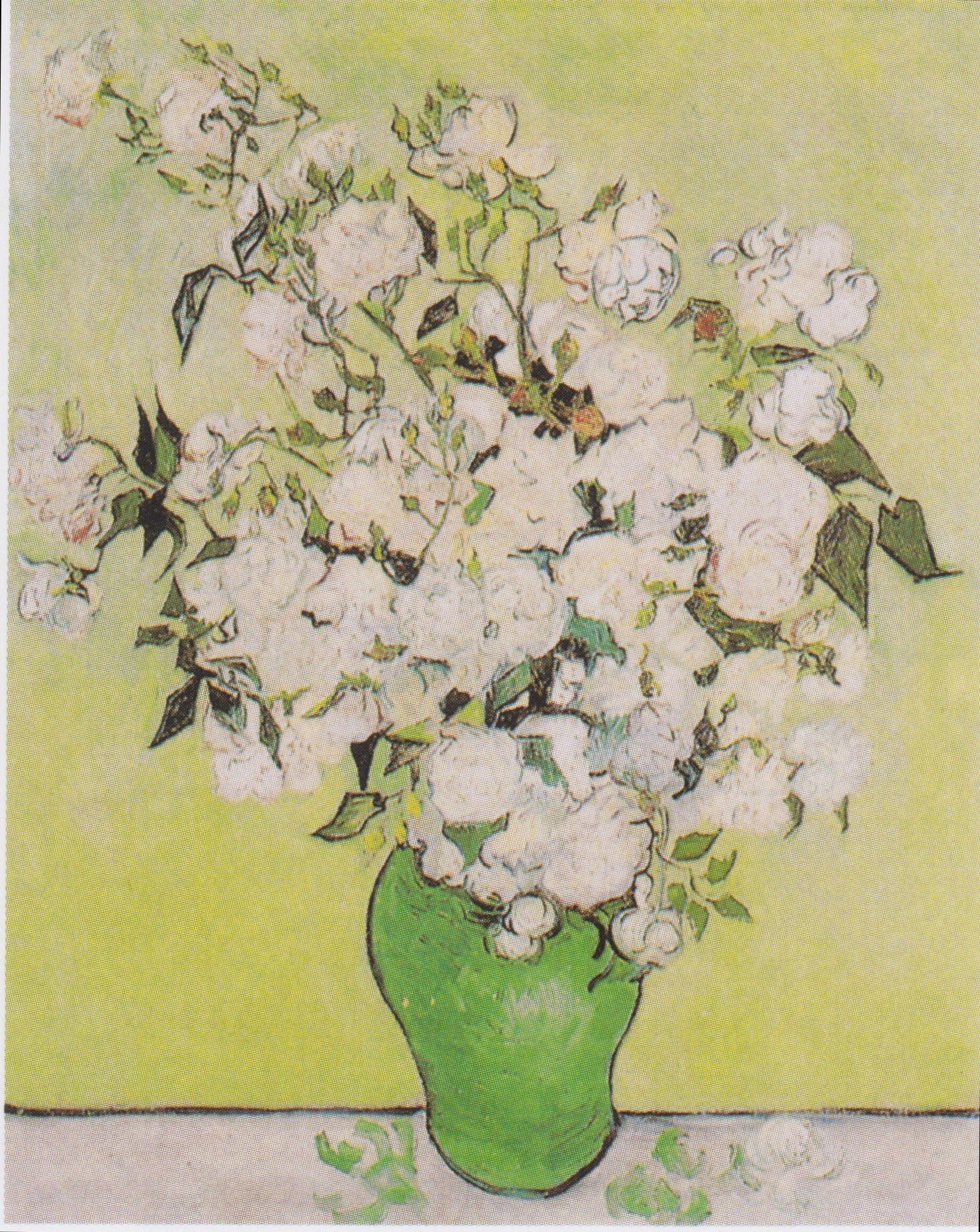
Still Life: Pink Roses in a Vase
May 1890
The Metropolitan Museum of Art, New York (F682)

=== Butterflies ===
Van Gogh made at least two paintings of butterflies and one of a moth while at Saint-Rémy.

==== Poppies and Butterflies ====
Debra Mancoff, author of Van Gogh's Flowers, described Poppies and Butterflies: "vivid red poppies and the pale yellow butterflies float on the surface of twisting dark stems and nodding buds, all against a yellow-gold background. Although composed of natural motifs, van Gogh's layering of pattern in Butterflies and Poppies suggests a decorative quality like that of a textile or a screen." Mancoff compared this study to the Japanese prints he admired.

==== Long Grass with Butterflies ====
London's National Gallery painting Long Grass with Butterflies, also called Meadow in the Garden of Saint-Paul Hospital, is a view of an abandoned garden with tall unkempt grass and weeds on the asylum grounds. The work was made towards the end of his stay in Saint-Rémy.

==== Green Peacock Moth ====
In May 1889 van Gogh began work on Green Peacock Moth which he self-titled Death's Head Moth. The moth, called death's head, is a rarely seen nocturnal moth. He described the large moth's colors "of amazing distinction, black, grey, cloudy white tinged with carmine or vaguely shading off into olive green." Behind the moth is a background of Lords-and-Ladies. The size of the moth and plants in the background pull the spectator into the work. The colors are vivid, consistent with van Gogh's passion and emotional intensity. Van Gogh Museum's title for this work is Emperor Moth.

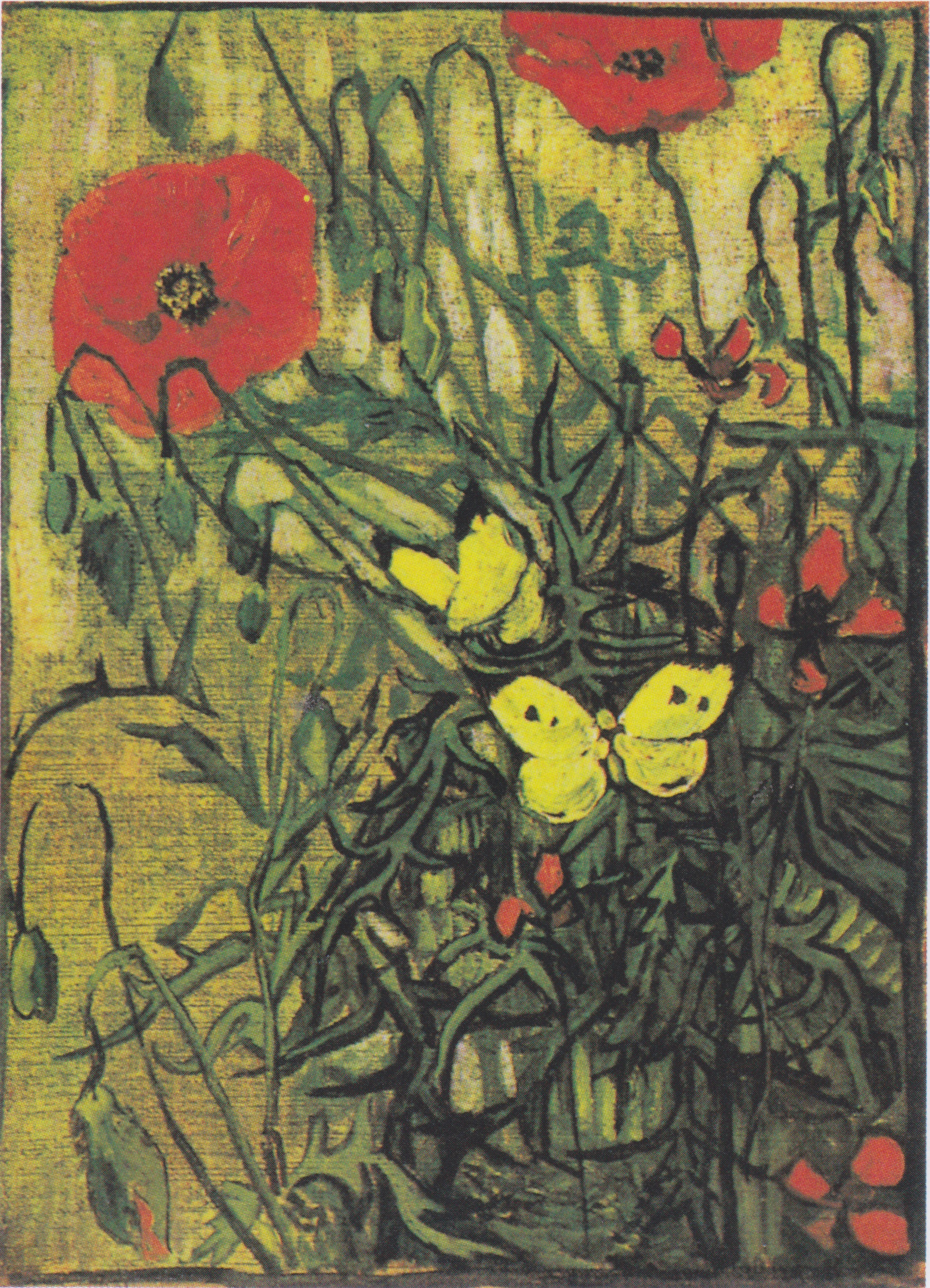
Poppies and Butterflies
April—May 1890
Van Gogh Museum, Amsterdam (F748)

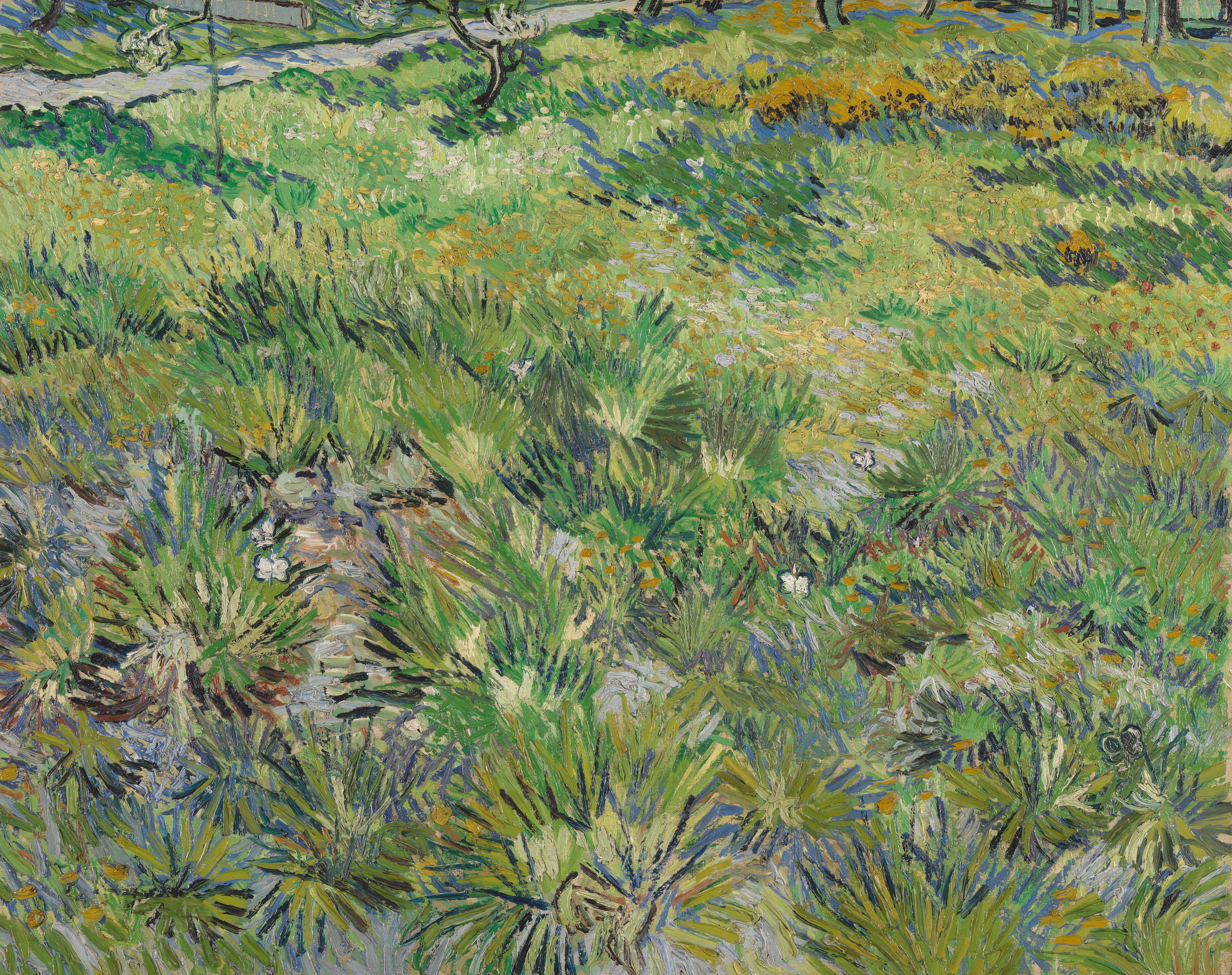
Field of Grass with Butterflies and Flowers
1889
National Gallery, London, England (F672)

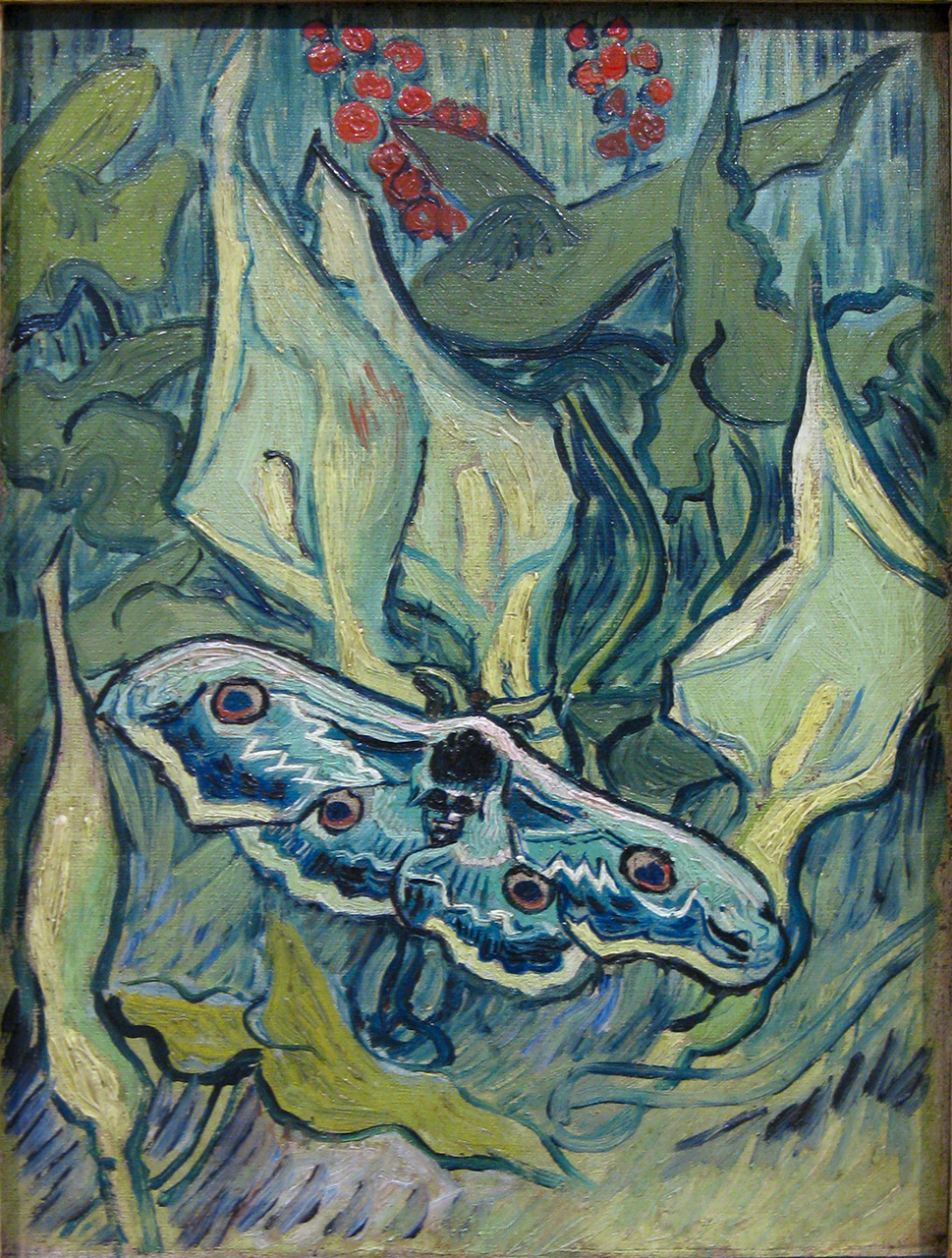
Great Peacock Moth (Death's-Head Moth on an Arum)
1889
Van Gogh Museum, Amsterdam, Netherlands (F610)

== The Starry Night ==
The Starry Night 1889 Museum of Modern Art, New York (F612)

The Starry Night depicts the view outside his sanitarium room window at night, although it was painted from memory during the day. Since 1941 it has been in the permanent collection of the Museum of Modern Art in New York City. Reproduced often, the painting is widely hailed as his magnum opus.

== The Wheat Field ==
Van Gogh worked on a group of paintings The Wheat Field based on the field of wheat enclosed by a wall that he could see from his cell at Saint-Paul Hospital. Beyond the field were the mountains from Arles. During his stay at the asylum he made about twelve paintings of the view of the enclosed wheat field and distant mountains. In May van Gogh wrote to Theo, "Through the iron-barred window I see a square field of wheat in an enclosure, a perspective like Van Goyen, above which I see the morning sun rising in all its glory." The stone wall, like a picture frame, helped to display the changing colors of the wheat field.

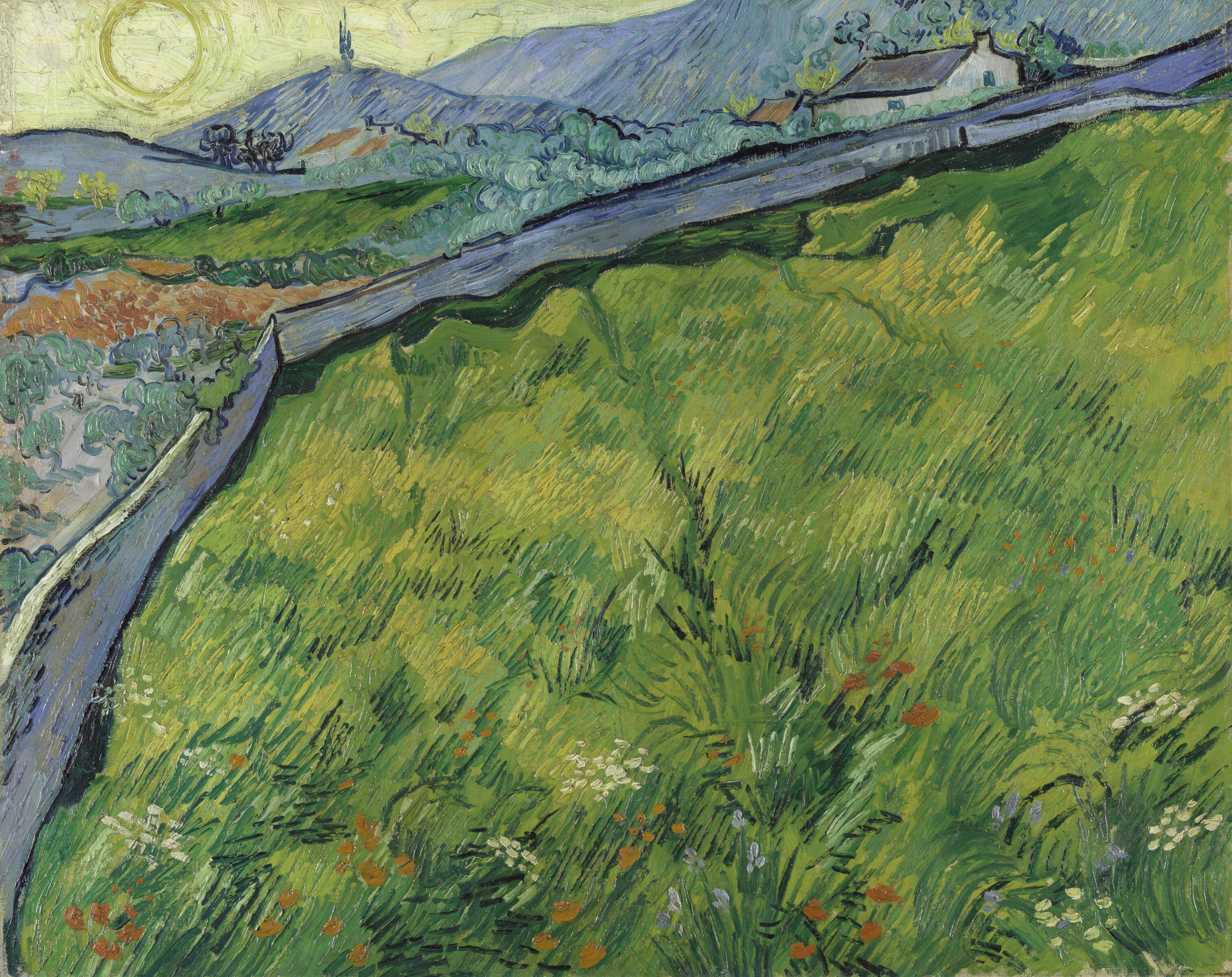
Enclosed Wheat Field with Rising Sun, May 1889, Kröller-Müller Museum, Otterlo, Netherlands (F720 )

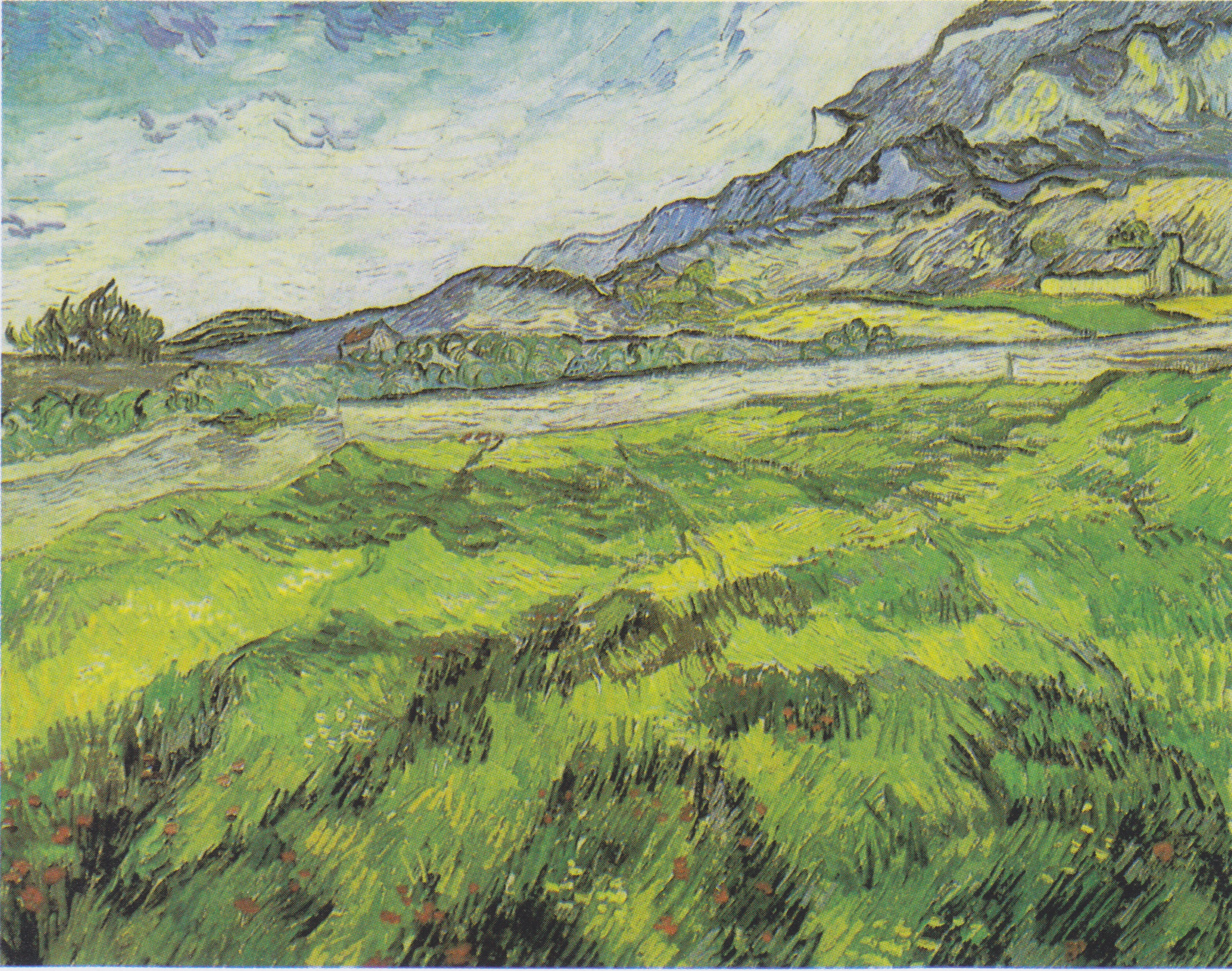
Green Wheat Field, June 1889, owner unclear, possibly on loan to Kunsthaus Zurich, Zurich (F718 )

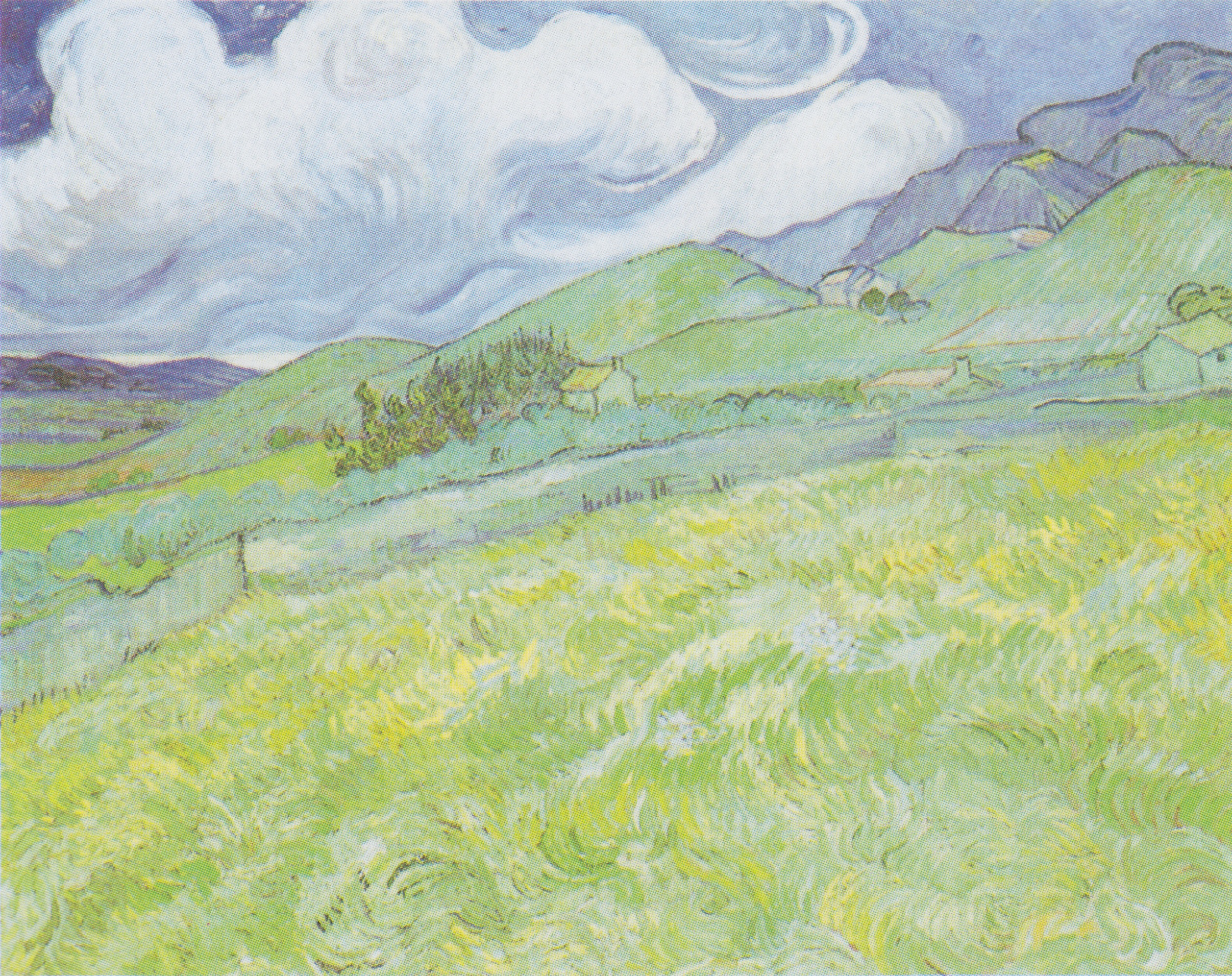
Mountainous Landscape Behind Saint-Rémy, June 1889, Ny Carlsberg Glyptotek, Copenhagen (F611 )

== Mount Gaussier with the house of Saint-Paul ==
Mont Gaussier, the dominant hill of the Alpilles range, can be seen from the streets of Saint-Remy. Van Gogh generally saw the Alpilles from his room or the grounds of Saint-Paul hospital. In van Gogh's Le Mont Gaussier with the Mas de Saint-Paul the Alpilles are painted in yellow, green and purple.

Left of Mont Gaussier is the Montagne des Deux Trous. In van Gogh's painting of this hill its dark holes are visible about the "undulating olive trees."

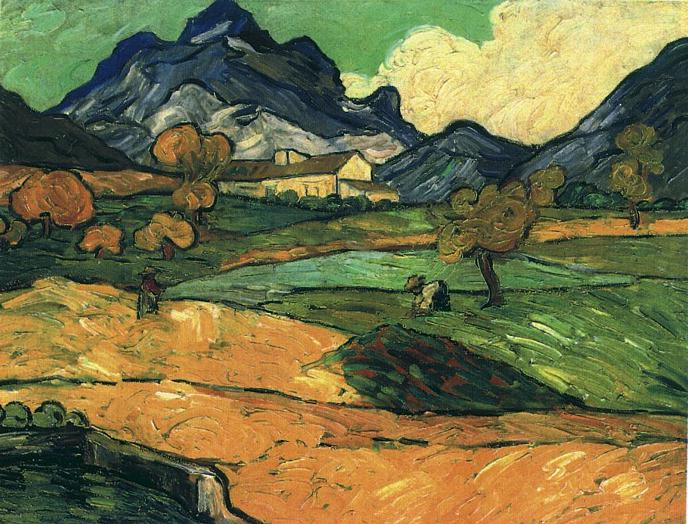
Le Mont Gaussier with the Mas de Saint-Paul (b/w copy)
1889
Private collection (F725)

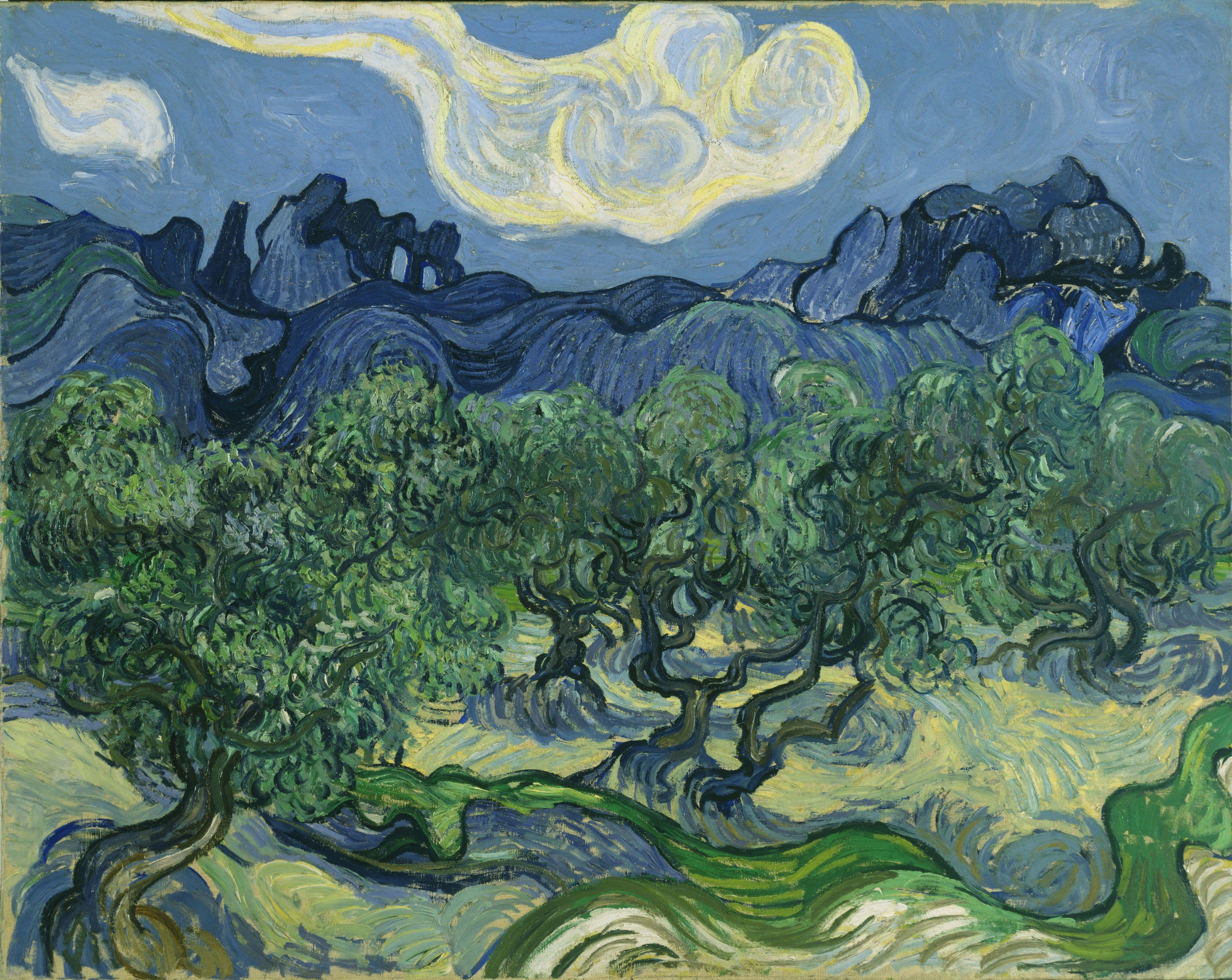
Montagne des Deux Trous also Olive Trees in a Mountainous Landscape (with the Alpilles in the Background)
1889
Museum of Modern Art, New York, NY (F712)

== Portraits ==
Van Gogh, known for his landscapes, seemed to find painting portraits his greatest ambition. To his sister he wrote, "I should like to paint portraits which appear after a century to people living then as apparitions. By which I mean that I do not endeavor to achieve this through photographic resemblance, but my means of our impassioned emotions – that is to say using our knowledge and our modern taste for color as a means of arriving at the expression and the intensification of the character."

While van Gogh had few opportunities to make portraits, he completed at least three at Saint-Rémy.

=== François and Jeanne Trabuc ===
François Trabuc, who was the chief orderly at Saint-Paul, and his wife, Jeanne both sat for van Gogh. François Trabuc had a look of "contemplative calm" which van Gogh found interesting in spite of the misery he had witness at Saint-Paul and a Marseille hospital during outbreaks of cholera. He wrote to Theo of Trabuc's character, a military presence and "small keen black eyes". If it were not for his intelligence and kindness, his eyes could seem like that of a bird of prey.

Van Gogh describes Jeanne Trabuc as a "washed-out kind of a woman, and unhappy, resigned creature of little consequence and so insignificant that I have a great desire to paint this dusty blade of grade. I’ve chatted with her a few times when I was doing some olive trees behind their little house, and she told me that she didn’t think I was ill – indeed you would say the same right now if you could see me working."

=== Portrait of a patient ===
While in Saint-Paul, van Gogh wrote of other patients and their support for one another, "Though here there are some patients very seriously ill, the fear and horror of madness that I used to have has already lessened a great deal. And though here you continually hear terrible cries and howls like beasts in a menagerie, in spite of that people get to know each other very well and help each other when their attacks come on."

Van Gogh wrote of a portrait he began in October 1889, "At the moment I am working on a portrait of one of the patients here. It is odd that when you have spent some time with them and have got used to them, you no longer think of them as mad."

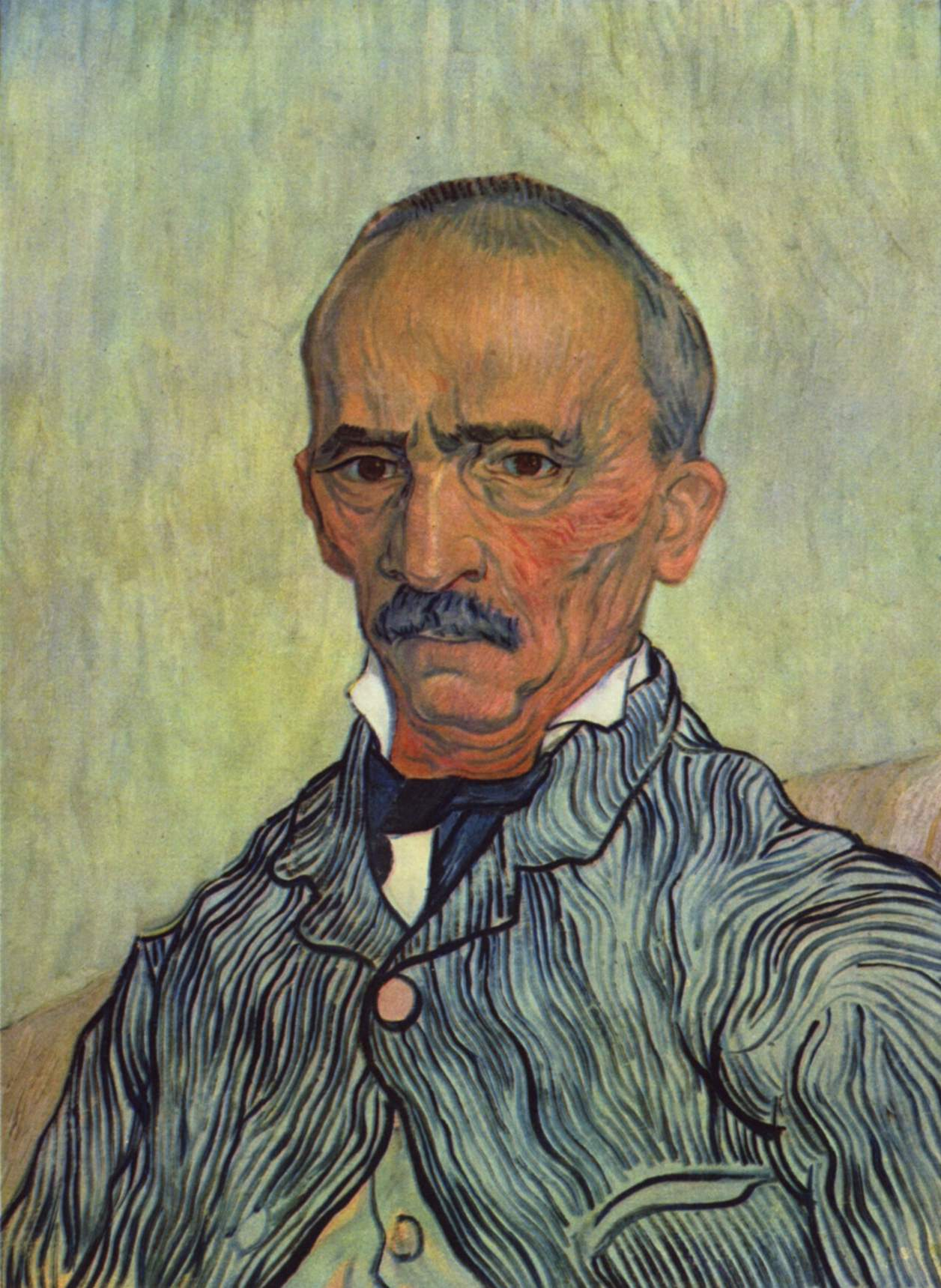
Portrait of Trabuc; Chief Orderly at Saint-Paul Hospital
1889
Kunstmuseum Solothurn, Solothrun, Switzerland (F629)

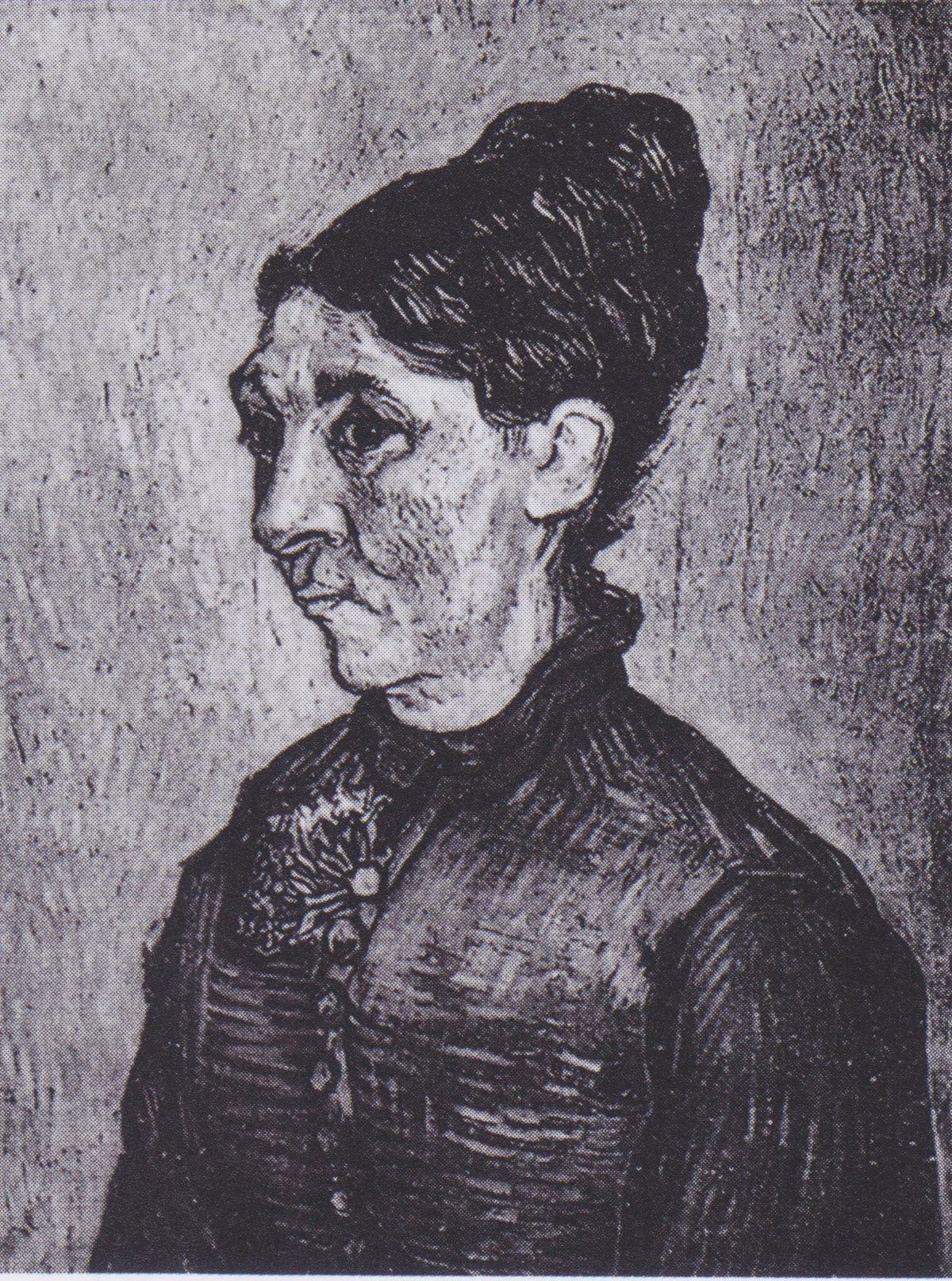
Portrait of Madame Trabuc (b/w copy)
1889
The Hermitage, St. Petersburg, Russia (F631)

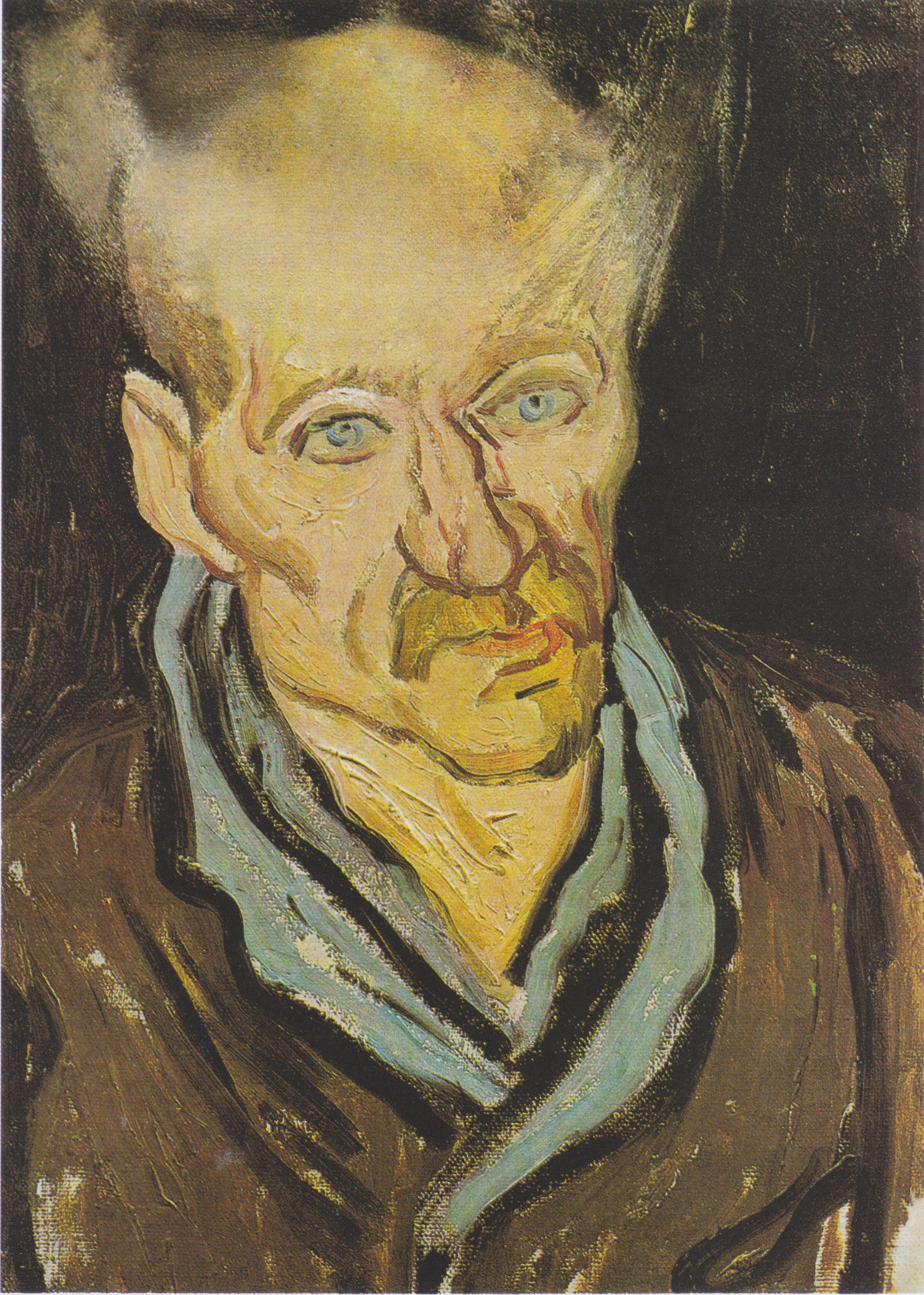
Portrait of a Patient in Saint-Paul Hospital
1889
Van Gogh Museum, Amsterdam, Netherlands (F703)

== Interest in van Gogh's work builds ==
While in Saint-Remy interest began to build in van Gogh's work:

- Theo, van Gogh's brother, wrote in July 1889, that Camille and Lucien Pissarro, Père Tanguy, Erik Theodor Werenskiold and Octave Maus, secretary of the Les XX group in Brussels, had seen the paintings that he'd made in southern France. On van Gogh's behalf, Theo accepted an offer from Maus to exhibit van Gogh's work at the Les XX group's upcoming exhibition.
- Van Gogh's Starry Night over the Rhone and The Irises were exhibited at the Société des Artistes Indépendants on the third of September.
- In January 1890 six of van Gogh's works were exhibited at the seventh exhibition of Les XX in Brussels along with, among others, Paul Cézanne, Camille Pissarro, Pierre-Auguste Renoir, Paul Signac and Henri de Toulouse-Lautrec. Van Gogh's painting The Red Vineyard was sold to artist Anna Boch at the exhibition for 400 francs.
- In the same month an article is published "Les Isole: Vincent van Gogh" in the Mercure de France.
- Ten of van Gogh's works were presented at the March 1890 Société des Artistes Indépendants. Paul Gauguin, Claude Monet, and Pissarro were quite impressed with his works.

Over this time, though, van Gogh's health ebbed and flowed between periods of attacks, recovery, and resumption of painting. In April 1890, near the end of van Gogh's stay at Saint-Paul's hospital, Theo wrote to his sister and mother, "I am so pleased that Vincent's work is being more appreciated. If he were fit I believe that there would be nothing for me to desire, but it appears that this is not to be."

The sale of Red Vineyard was the only sale of van Gogh's paintings made during his lifetime.

== See also ==
- List of works by Vincent van Gogh
