= Rain (Van Gogh) =

1889 oil painting by Vincent van Gogh

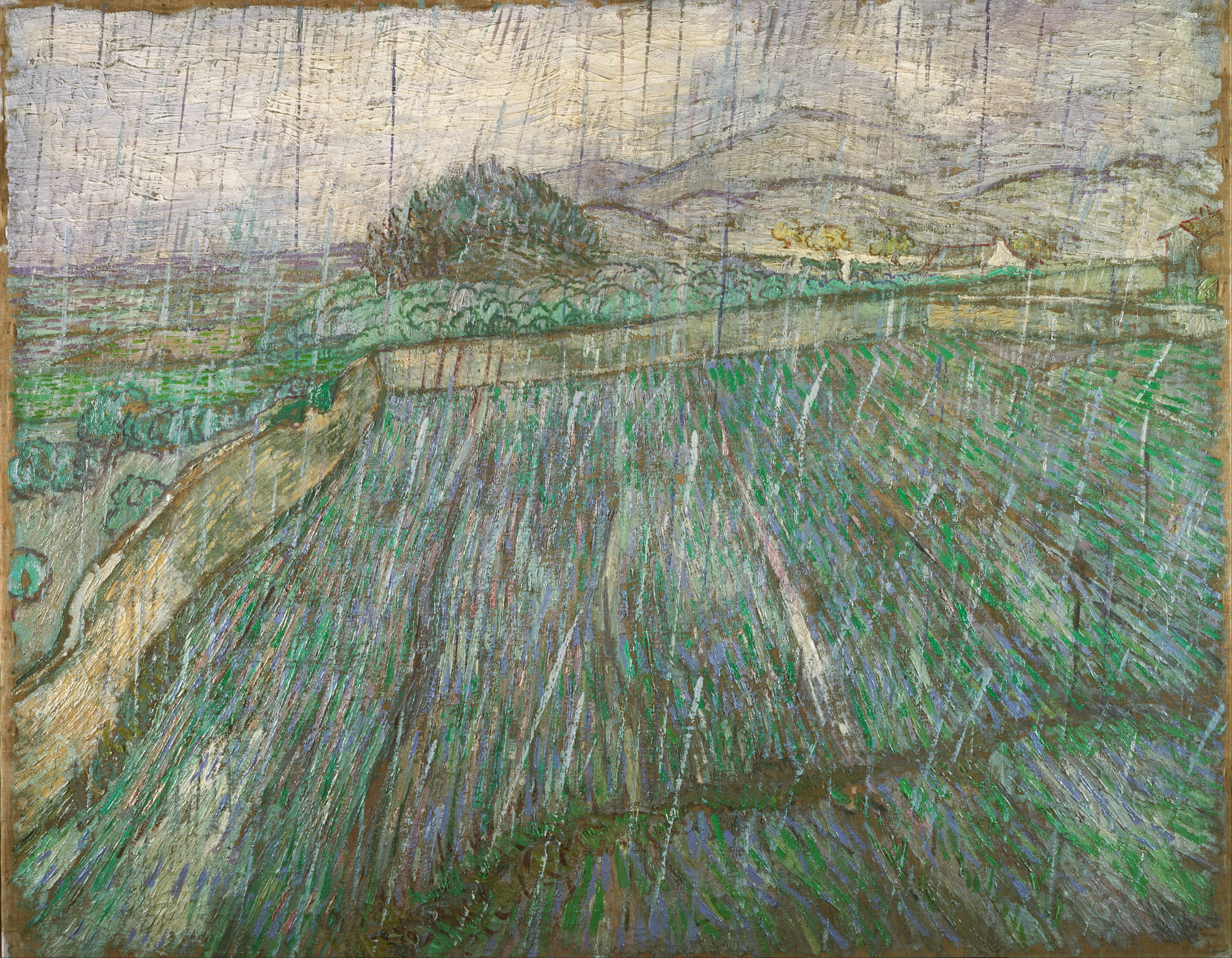
- Artist: Vincent van Gogh
- Year: 1889
- Catalogue: F650; JH1839
- Medium: oil on canvas
- Dimensions: 73.3 cm × 92.4 cm (28.9 in × 36.4 in)
- Location: Philadelphia Museum of Art, Philadelphia

Rain (French: La Pluie;) is an oil-on-canvas painting by Vincent van Gogh, created in 1889, while he was a voluntary patient at an asylum in Saint-Rémy-de-Provence. He repeatedly painted the view through the window of his room, depicting the colours and shades of the fields and hills around Saint-Rémy as they appeared at various times of day and in varying weather conditions.

Rain measures 73.3 cm × 92.4 cm (28.9 in × 36.4 in) and is held by the Philadelphia Museum of Art in the United States.

== Background and composition ==
Van Gogh was a voluntary patient from May 1889 to May 1890 in the hospital at the Asylum of Saint-Paul-de-Mausole, a former monastery at Saint-Rémy-de-Provence. One subject of particular interest of Van Gogh during his residence at the Saint-Paul-de-Mausole hospital was a field behind the hospital, enclosed by walls, which he depicted in a series of at least 14 paintings and just as many sketches. He captured the field at different times of the day and in changing seasons. Having painted The Reaper in June 1889, which depicts a peasant cutting wheat with a sickle at the end of the summer, and then Enclosed Field with Peasant, around 12 October 1889, with a peasant carrying a bundle of straw in a bare ploughed field, he repainted the field during a rain shower a few weeks later. The later scene reflected the "subdued greens, grape blues, and soft violets" of autumn.

Rain was painted on an untreated cotton canvas in November 1889, or during heavy rainfall on 31 October 1889. Van Gogh represented the rain as slanted lines at a different angle to the lines in the wheat field in the background. In creating this effect, he drew inspiration from Japanese prints, like those of Hiroshige with which he was familiar. The painting is mentioned in two letters to his brother Theo van Gogh. In a letter c. 3 November 1889, Vincent said that a painting of a rain effect was in progress and, in a letter dated 3 January 1890 that he sent to Theo along with several paintings, he gave it the simple title La Pluie ( ' The Rain'). This rain effect was again used in Landscape at Auvers in the Rain, Sower in the Rain (F1550), and Sower in the Rain (F1551r).

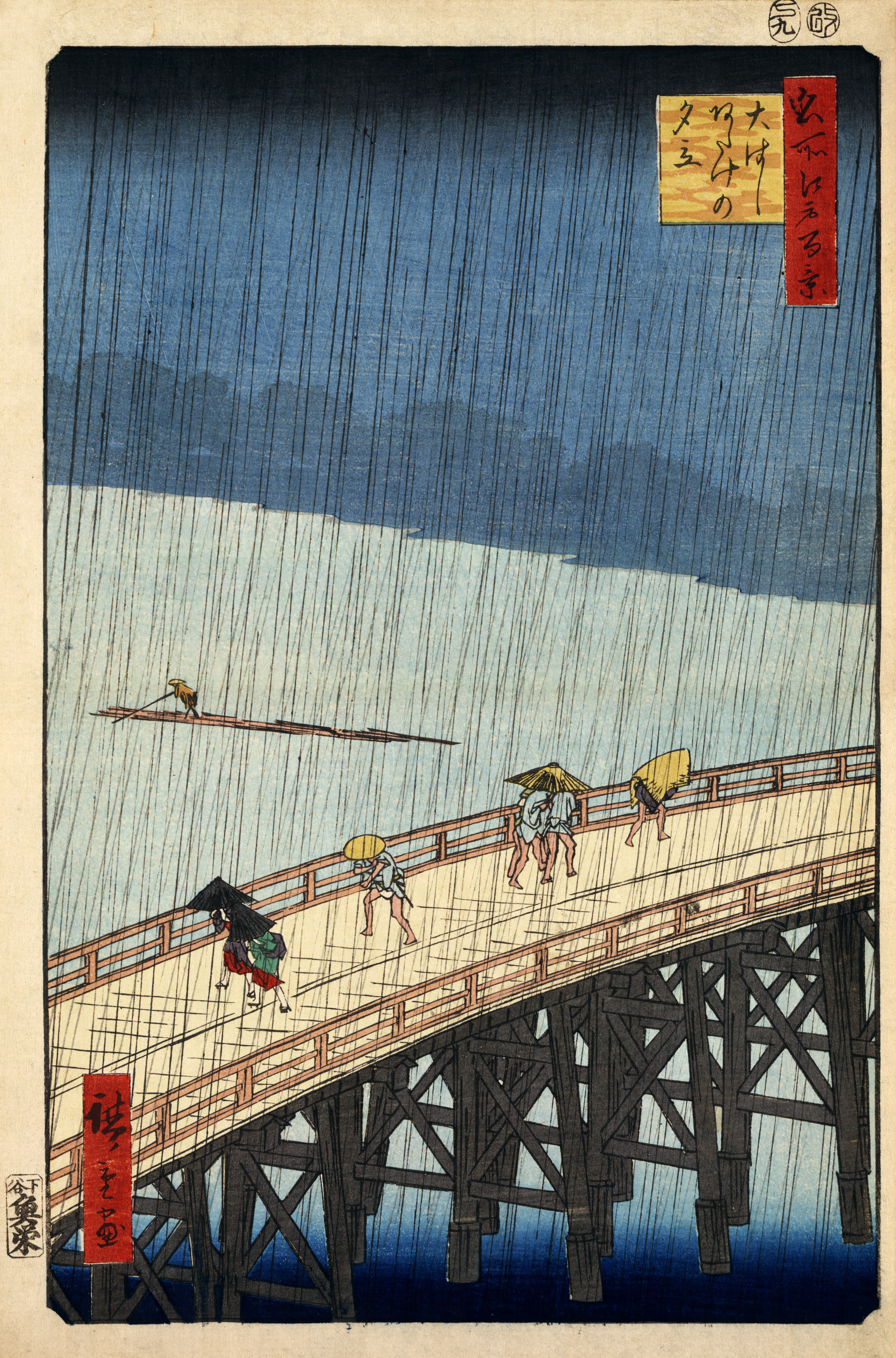
Sudden Shower over Shin-Ōhashi bridge and Atake (1857) by Hiroshige

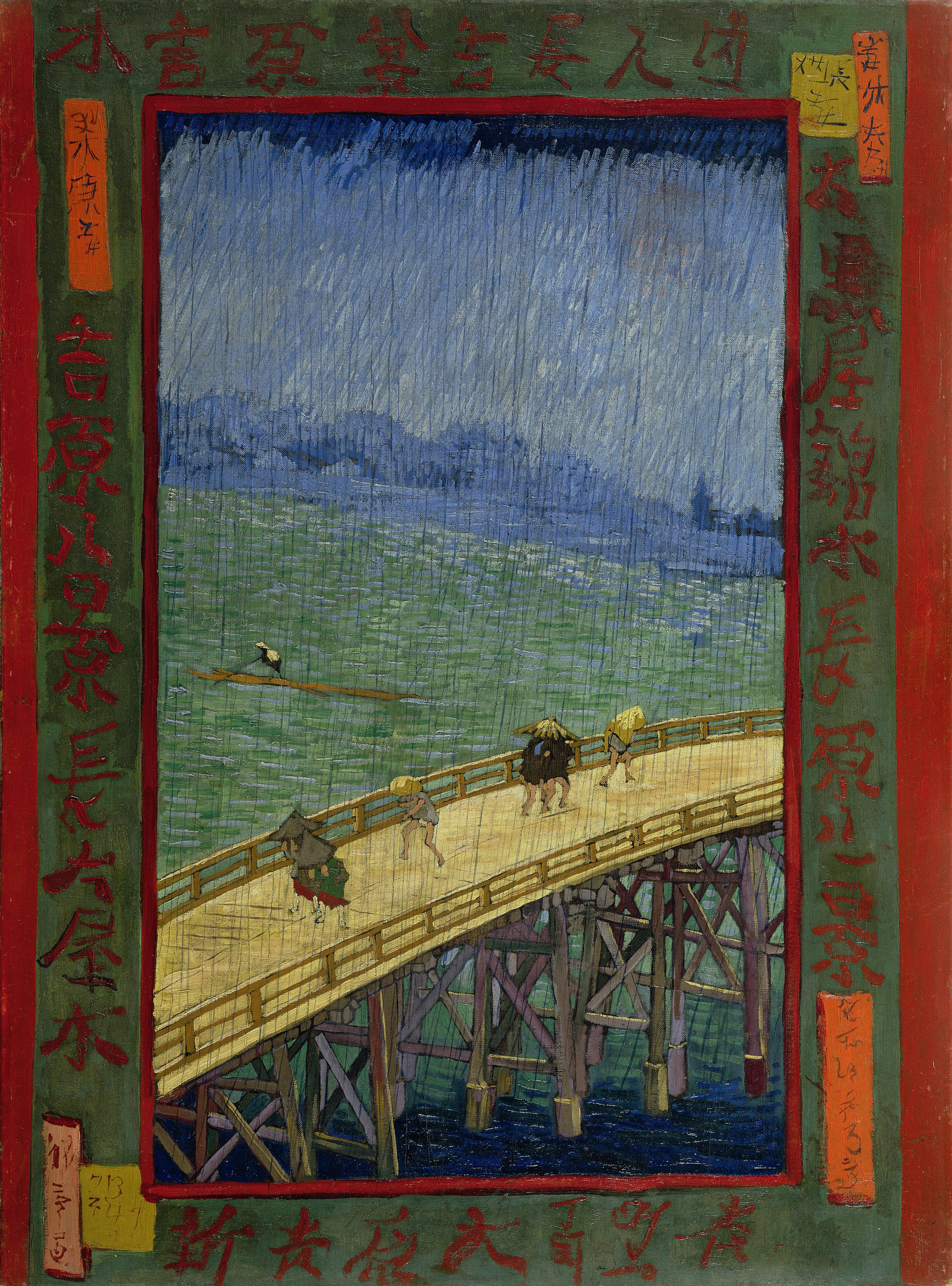
The Bridge in the Rain (after Hiroshige) (1887), Van Gogh (F372)

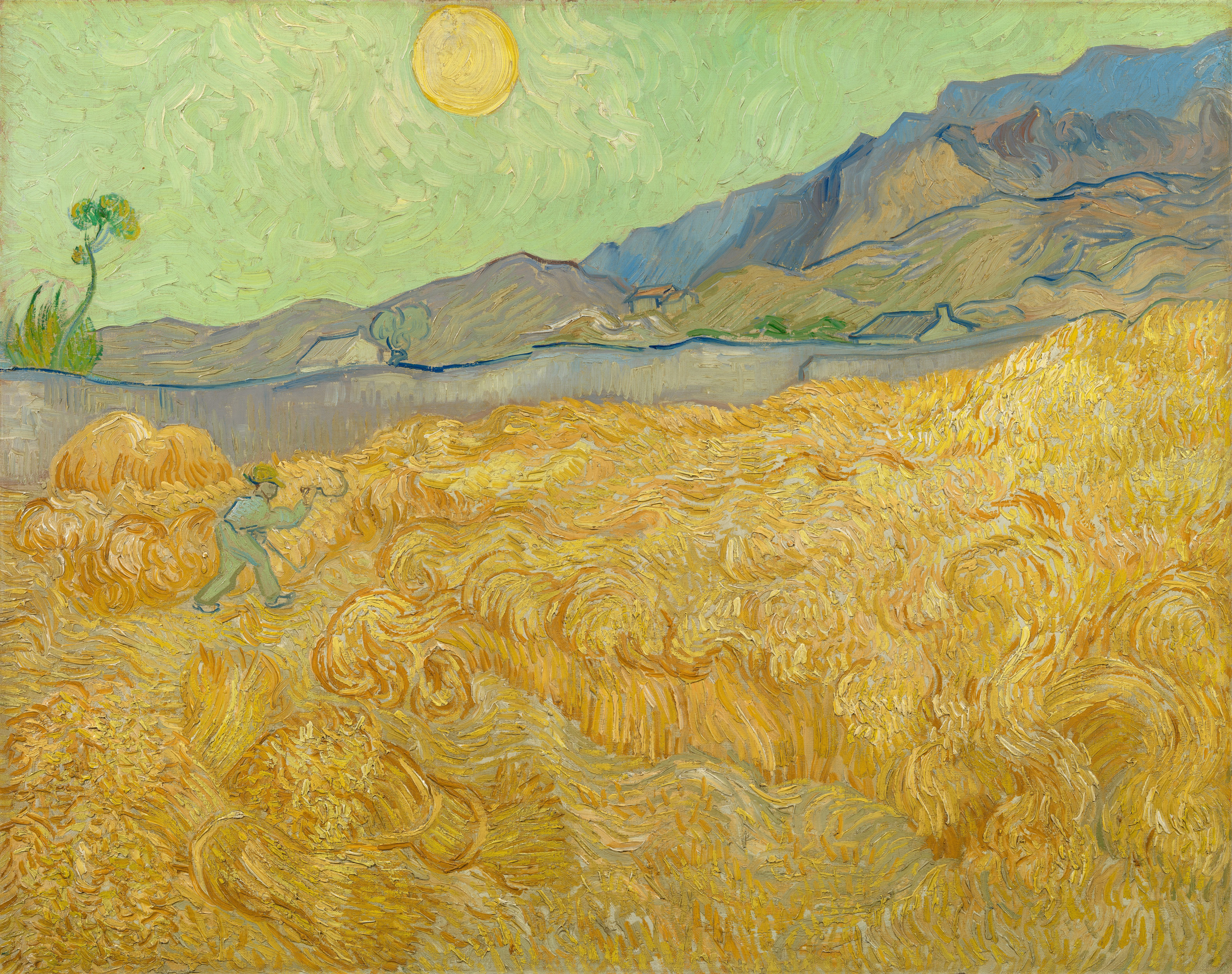
Wheat Field with Reaper (September 1889), Van Gogh (F618)

Enclosed Field with Peasant (1889), Van Gogh (F641)

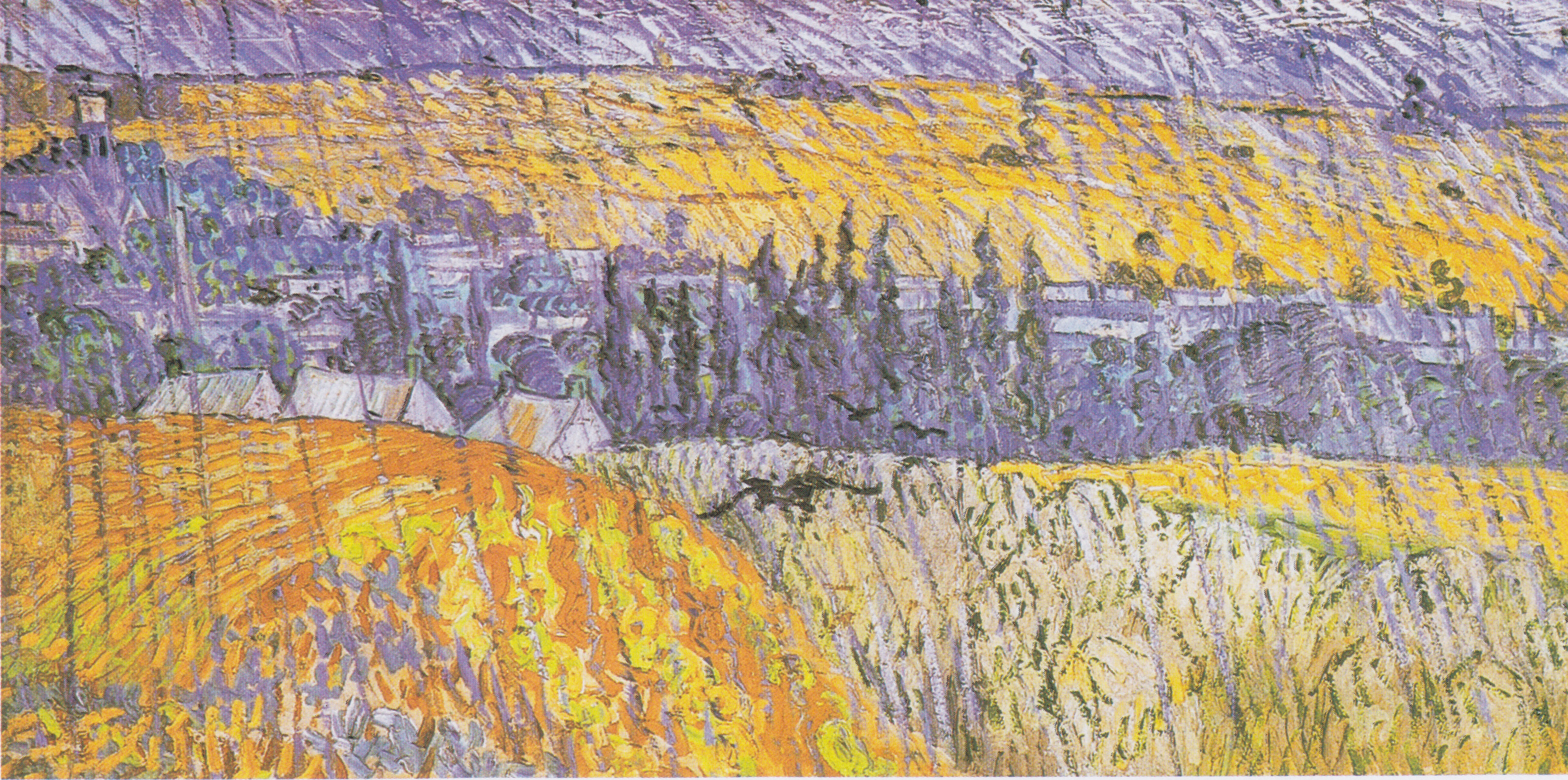
Landscape at Auvers in the Rain (1890), Van Gogh (F811)

== Provenance ==
On Van Gogh's death in 1890, the painting was inherited by his sister-in-law, Johanna van Gogh-Bonger. In 1903, it was exhibited at the Munich Secession exhibition where it was purchased by the collector Hugo von Tschudi. His wife Angela von Tschudi inherited it on his death in 1911. She lent it to the Neue Pinakothek in Munich and, in 1928, the painting was sold to the art dealer Paul Rosenberg, who in turn sold it to Henry Plumer McIlhenny in 1949. McIlhenny was associated with the Philadelphia Museum of Art, serving as its chairman from 1976 until his death in 1986. He bequeathed his art collection to the museum, in memory of his mother, Frances Plumer McIlhenny.

== See also ==
- List of works by Vincent van Gogh

== Sources ==
Letters

- Van Gogh, Vincent (3 November 1889). "816 (818, 613): To Theo van Gogh. Saint-Rémy-de-Provence, on or about Sunday, 3 November 1889". Vincent van Gogh Letters. Archived from the original on 12 February 2026.
- Van Gogh, Vincent (3 January 1890). "834 (836, 621): To Theo van Gogh. Saint-Rémy-de-Provence, Friday, 3 January 1890". Vincent van Gogh Letters. Archived from the original on 18 November 2025.

Books

- Bailey, Martin (27 August 2018). Starry Night: Van Gogh at the Asylum. White Lion Publishing. ISBN 978-0-7112-3920-3.
- Herzogenrath, Wulf; Hansen, Dorothee (2002). Van Gogh: fields : the Field with poppies and the artists' dispute. Hatje Cantz. ISBN 978-3-7757-1131-9.
- Pickvance, Ronald (1986). Van Gogh in Saint-Rémy and Auvers. Metropolitan Museum of Art. p. 139. ISBN 978-0-87099-477-7.
- Porter, Julian; Grant, Stephen (30 September 2017). 149 Paintings You Really Need to See in North America: (So You Can Ignore the Others). Dundurn. p. 321. ISBN 978-1-4597-3936-9.
- Silverman, Debora (17 July 2004). Van Gogh and Gauguin: The Search for Sacred Art. Macmillan. ISBN 978-0-374-52932-1.
