= A Meadow in the Mountains: Le Mas de Saint-Paul =

1889 painting by Vincent van Gogh

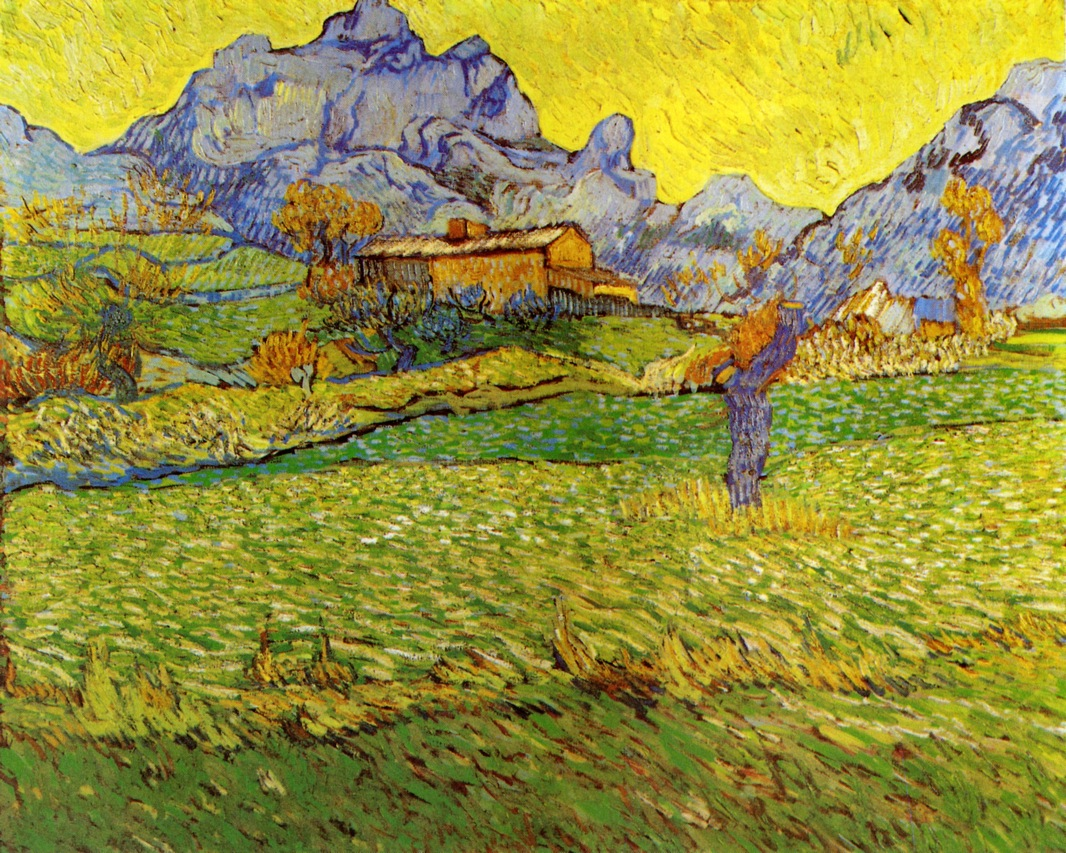
- Artist: Vincent van Gogh
- Year: December 1889
- Catalogue: F721; JH1864
- Dimensions: 73 cm × 91.5 cm (29 in × 36.0 in)
- Location: Kröller-Müller Museum; Otterlo, Netherlands

A Meadow in the Mountains: Le Mas de Saint-Paul was painted by Vincent van Gogh in December 1889. It depicts fields of young wheat with a background of lilac mountains and yellowish sky.

In May 1889 Van Gogh voluntarily entered the asylum of St. Paul near Saint-Rémy in Provence. There Van Gogh had access to an adjacent cell he used as his studio. He was initially confined to the immediate asylum grounds and painted the world he saw from his room, such as ivy covered trees, lilacs, and irises of the garden. Van Gogh could also see an enclosed wheat field, subject of many paintings at Saint-Rémy. As he ventured outside the asylum walls he painted the wheat fields, olive groves and cypress trees of the surrounding countryside, which he saw as "characteristic of Provence". Over the course of the year, he painted about 150 canvases.

Van Gogh sent the painting to his brother Theo on 3 January 1890, with an accompanying letter in which he refers to the work as The Fields. It is now held in the Kröller-Müller Museum in the Netherlands.

== See also ==
- List of works by Vincent van Gogh
