= The Wheat Field =

Series of paintings by Vincent van Gogh

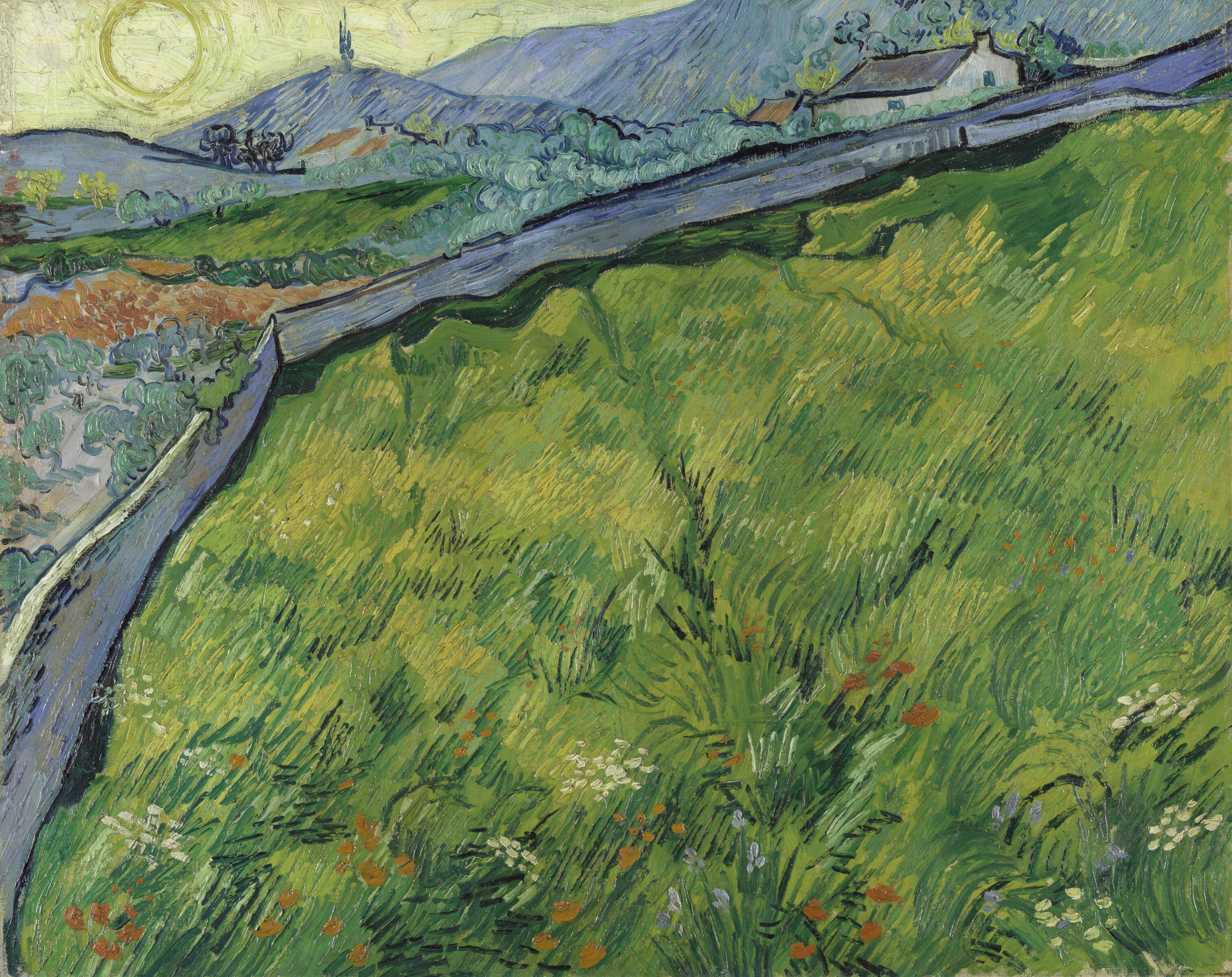
Enclosed Wheat Field with Rising Sun, May 1889, Kröller-Müller Museum, Otterlo, Netherlands (F720)

The Wheat Field is a series of oil paintings executed by Vincent van Gogh in Saint-Rémy-de-Provence. All of them depict the view Van Gogh had from the window of his bedroom on the top floor of the asylum: a field enclosed by stone walls just beneath his window and excluded from normal life by the rear wall of the asylum grounds; beyond this enclosure farm land, accompanied by olive groves and vineyards, ran up to the hills at the foot of the mountain range called Les Alpilles.

From May 1889 to May 1890, Van Gogh recorded this view in changing settings: after a storm, with a reaper in the field, with fresh wheat raising in autumn and with flowers in the spring. This is one of Van Gogh's major series from Saint-Rémy, comprising works such as the Wheat Field at Sunrise in the Kröller-Müller Museum. Van Gogh included the Enclosed Field with Rising Sun (F737) made in December 1889 in his Display at Les XX 1890 in Brussels.

Van Gogh worked on a group of paintings "The Wheat Field" that he could see from his cell at Saint-Paul Hospital. From the studio room he could see a field of wheat, enclosed by a wall. Beyond that were the mountains from Arles. During his stay at the asylum he made about twelve paintings of the view of the enclosed wheat field and distant mountains. In May Van Gogh wrote to Theo, "Through the iron-barred window I see a square field of wheat in an enclosure, a perspective like Van Goyen, above which I see the morning sun rising in all its glory." The stone wall, like a picture frame, helped to display the changing colors of the wheat field.

== Spring and summer, 1889 ==
The Kröller-Müller Museum's Enclosed Wheat Field with Rising Sun was painted in May 1889. Van Gogh used the rising sun above fields of wheat to represent its life giving energy.

Green Wheat Field was painted in June 1889. Van Gogh had a tender feeling about green wheat, likening it to that of a baby: "Young wheat has something inexpressibly pure and tender about it, which awakens the same emotion as the expression of a sleeping baby." Towards the end of his life he regarded his most delicate works, a young wheat field with the rising sun or a blooming orchard, as his "babies".

Van Gogh describes Mountainous Landscape Behind Saint-Rémy, also made in June, as a view taken in the hills seen from his bedroom window: "In the foreground, a field of wheat ruined and hurled to the ground by a storm. A boundary wall and beyond the grey foliage of a few olive trees, some huts and the hills. Then at the top of the canvas a great white and grey cloud floating in the azure."

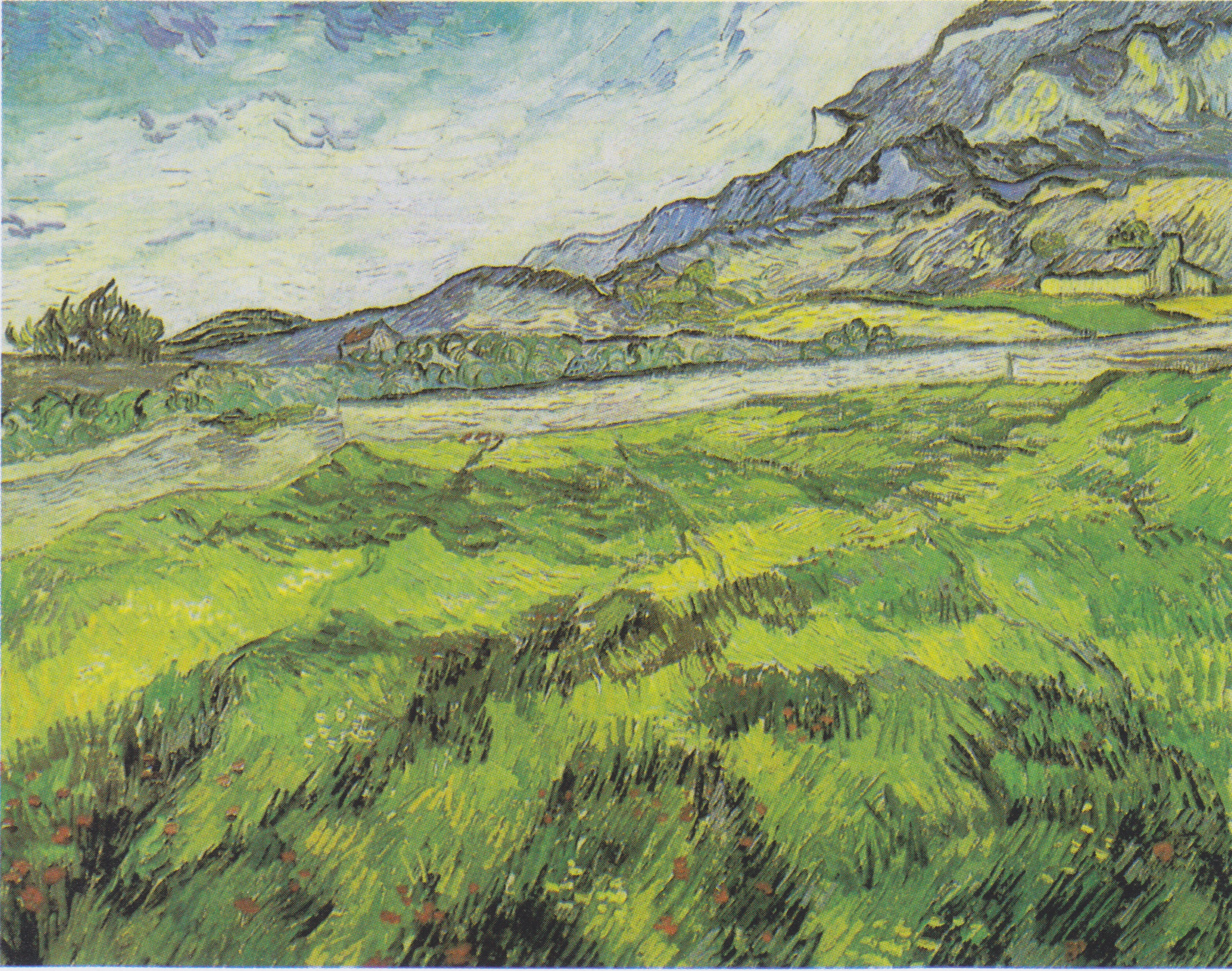
Green Wheat Field, June 1889, owner unclear, possibly on loan to Kunsthaus Zurich, Zurich (F718)

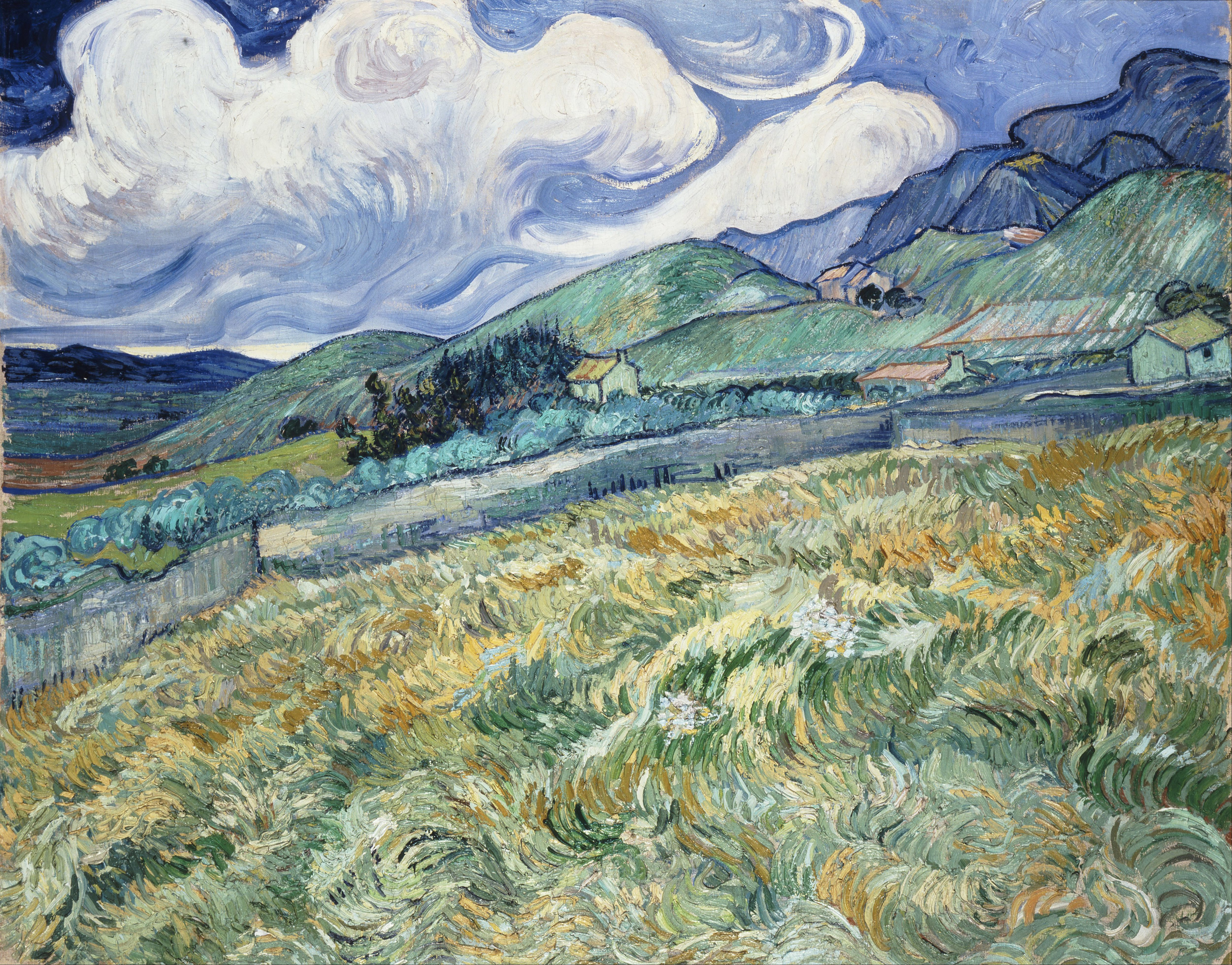
Mountainous Landscape Behind Saint-Rémy, June 1889, Ny Carlsberg Glyptotek, Copenhagen (F611)

In late June Van Gogh painted Wheat Field with Reaper and Sun which he described as "a wheat field, very yellow and very light, perhaps the lightest canvas I have done".

In July he painted Kröller-Müller Museum's Landscape with Wheat Sheaves and Rising Moon which he describes as "a moonrise over the same field as the sketch in Gauguin's letter, but in it some stacks take the place of the wheat. It is dull yellow-ochre and violet."

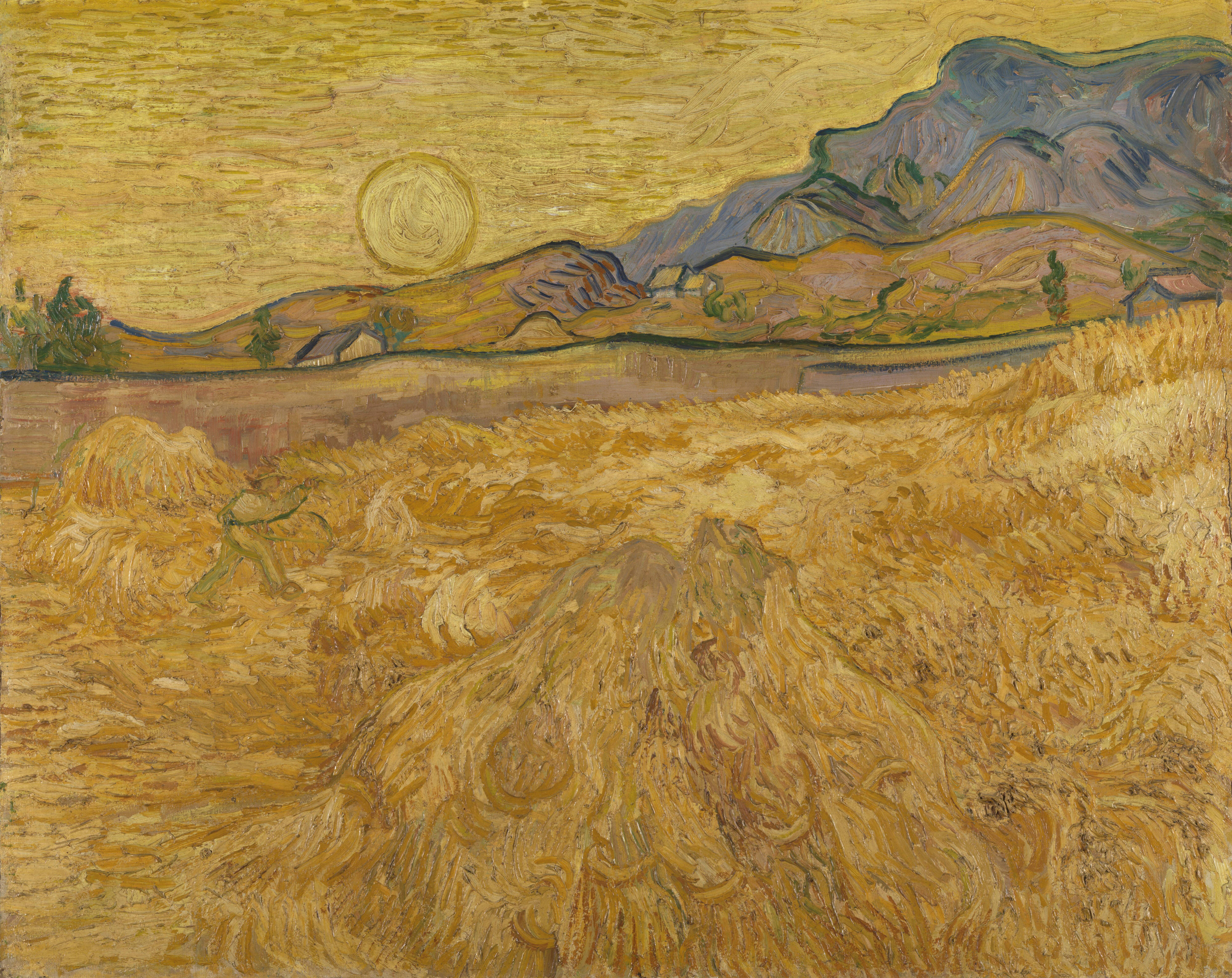
Wheat Field with Reaper and Sun, Late June 1889, Oil on canvas, Kröller-Müller Museum, Otterlo, Netherlands (F617)

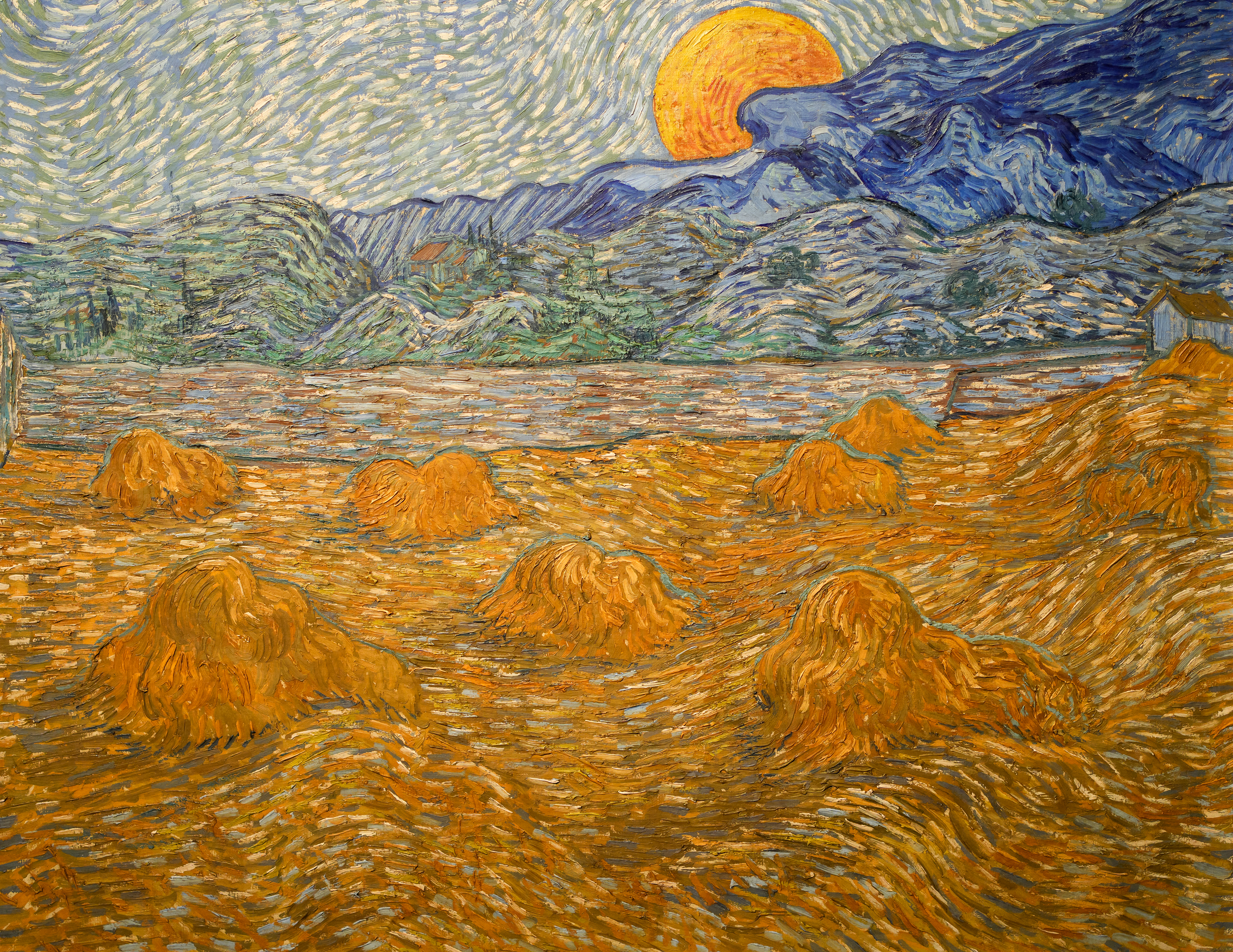
Landscape with Wheat Sheaves and Rising Moon, July 1889, Kröller-Müller Museum, Otterlo, Netherlands (F735)

Enclosed Field with Ploughman was made in August 1889, which is held in a private collection (F625).

== Two complementary fall paintings ==
The Wheat Field with a Reaper was started in the summer before a bout of illness and completed in September. Here Van Gogh depicts a reaper in a sun-drenched wheat field. Referring to a Biblical metaphor, Van Gogh wrote of the meaning of this painting, "In this reaper – a vague figure laboring like the devil in the terrible heat to finish his task – I saw an image of death, in the sense that the wheat being reaped represented mankind... But there is nothing sad in this death, it takes place in broad daylight, under a sun that bathes everything in a fine, golden light."

Enclosed Field with Peasant was painted over several days in October, working just outside the hospital. It accurately reflects the topography of the walled wheat field with the peaks of the Alpilles in the background. Van Gogh's brushwork brings life to this picture of furrowed soil and craggy mountains. At the center, a peasant carries a bundle of straw, a symbol of the cycles of life. Van Gogh described this painting as a pendant to The Reaper, which resides at the Van Gogh Museum in Amsterdam, both in vivid complementary colors of yellow and blue-violet. Both he considers harsh studies, but instead of being almost entirely yellow like The Reaper, the "picture is almost entirely violet. Broken violet and neutral tints."

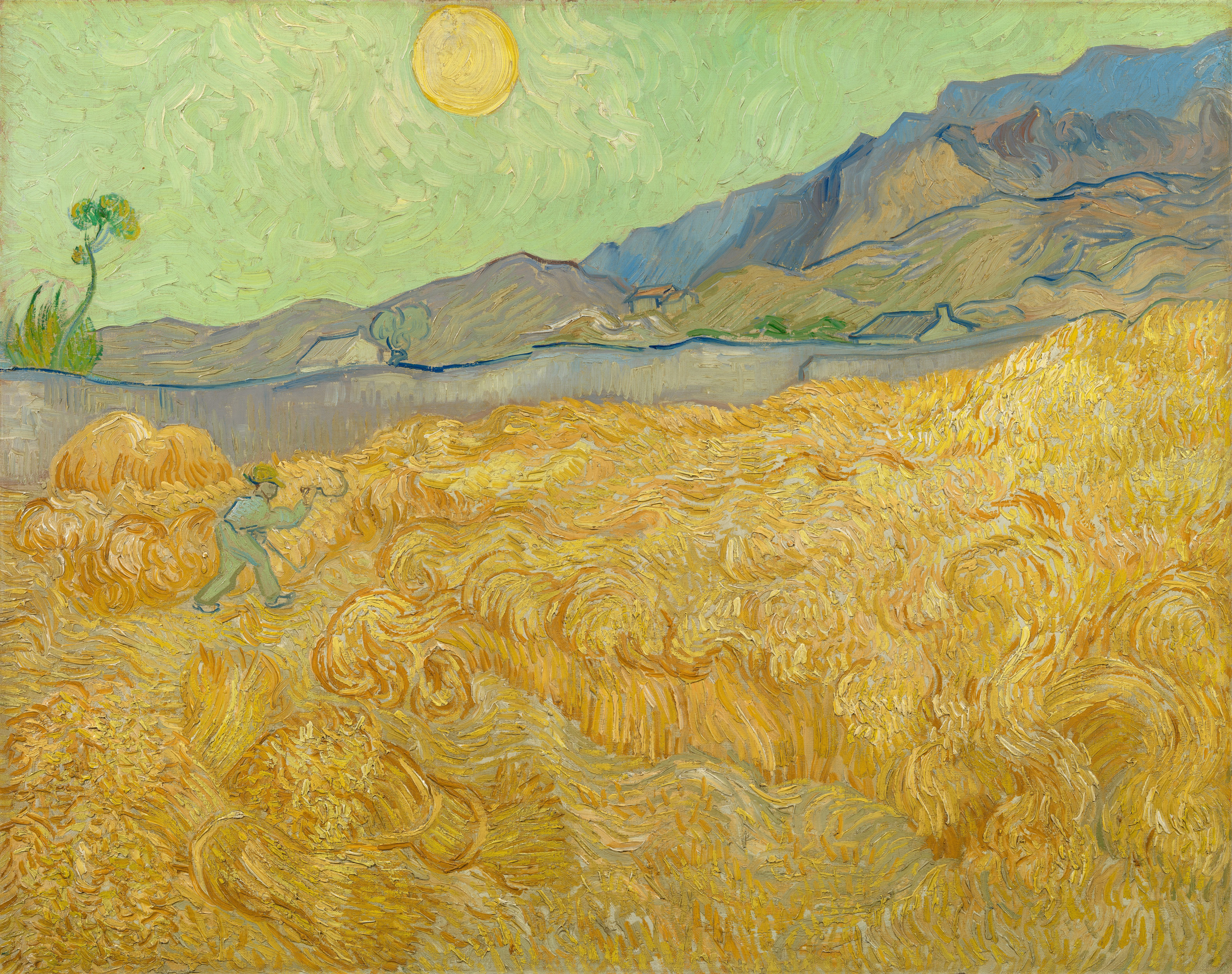
Wheat Field with Reaper, September 1889, Van Gogh Museum, Amsterdam (F618)

Landscape at Saint-Rémy (Enclosed Field with Peasant), early October 1889, Indianapolis Museum of Art, Indianapolis, Indiana (F641)

== Fall and winter, 1889 ==
In September Van Gogh worked on Wheat Field behind Saint-Paul Hospital with a Reaper. Intending to paint a pure sulfur yellow, he wrote to Émile Bernard that he had taken up the "devil of a question of yellow". He explained to his brother Theo, "I see in this reaper – an undefined figure, struggling in the intense heat like the devil to finish his work – I see him as an image of death in the sense that the humans are the corn that is being cut down. So it is, if you will, the opposite of the sowing that I tried earlier. But this death is not sad, it takes place in bright light with a sun that covers everything with a light like pure gold."

Rain, also called Enclosed Wheat Field in the Rain, is unique to Van Gogh's work in the South. He represented falling rain by diagonal lines of paint. The style is reminiscent of Japanese prints, but the effect is stylistically personal to Van Gogh.

In December Van Gogh made Wheat Field with a Rising Sun, held in a private collection. The work, started in late November, shows a sunrise above a field of young wheat in the complementary colors of yellow-green and purple. Deep furrows run towards the enclosed wall behind which is a row of purple hills. The sun is surrounded by a large yellow halo. Van Gogh sought to "express calmness, great peace". Further, he expresses "without making direct reference to the actual Gethsemane... and there is no need to portray figures from the Sermon on the Mount in order to express a comforting and gentle motif." It was one of the six canvases he selected for the exhibit at Les Vingt [XX] in Brussels in 1890.

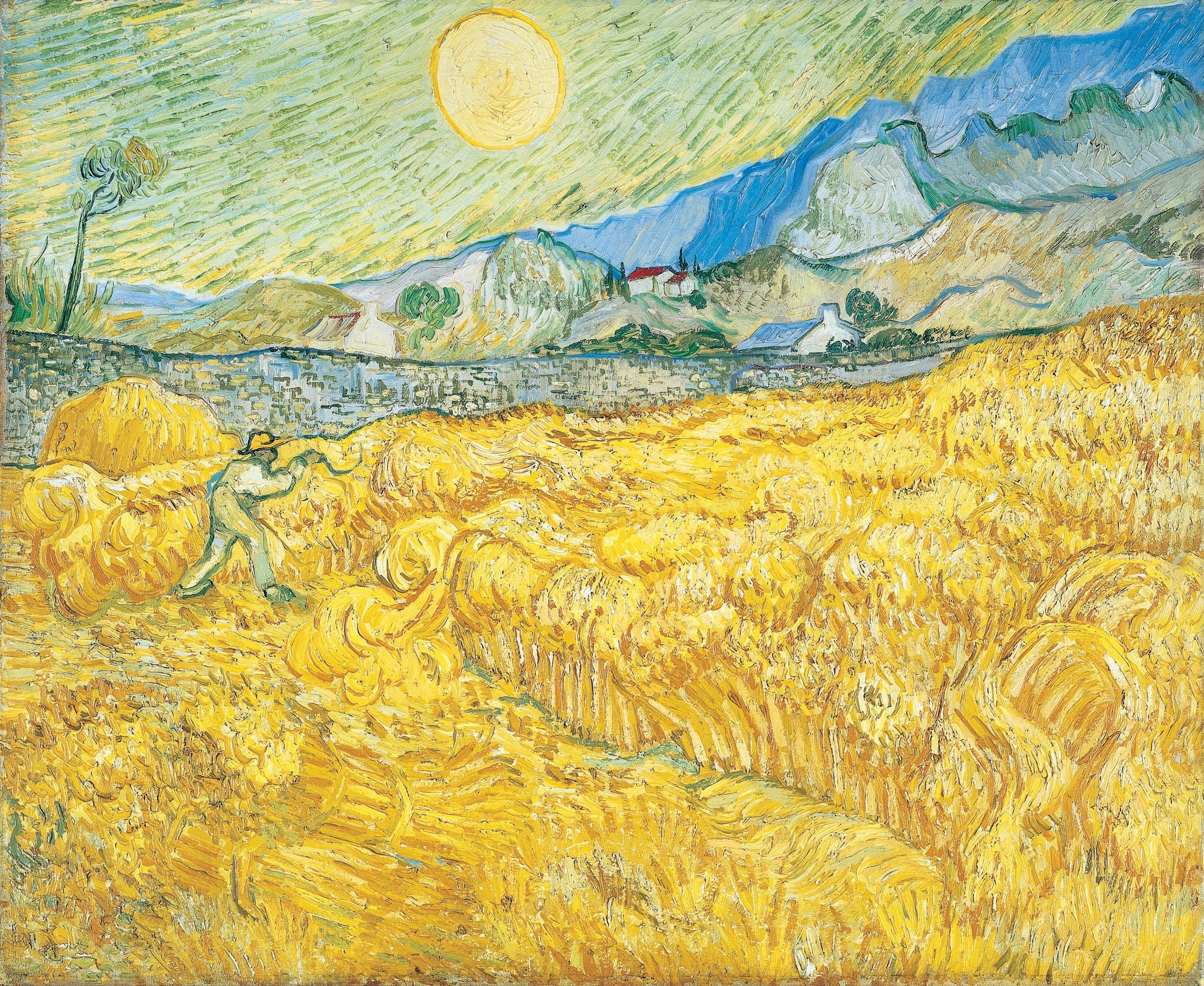
Wheat Field behind Saint-Paul with Reaper, September 1889, Museum Folkwang, Essen (F619)

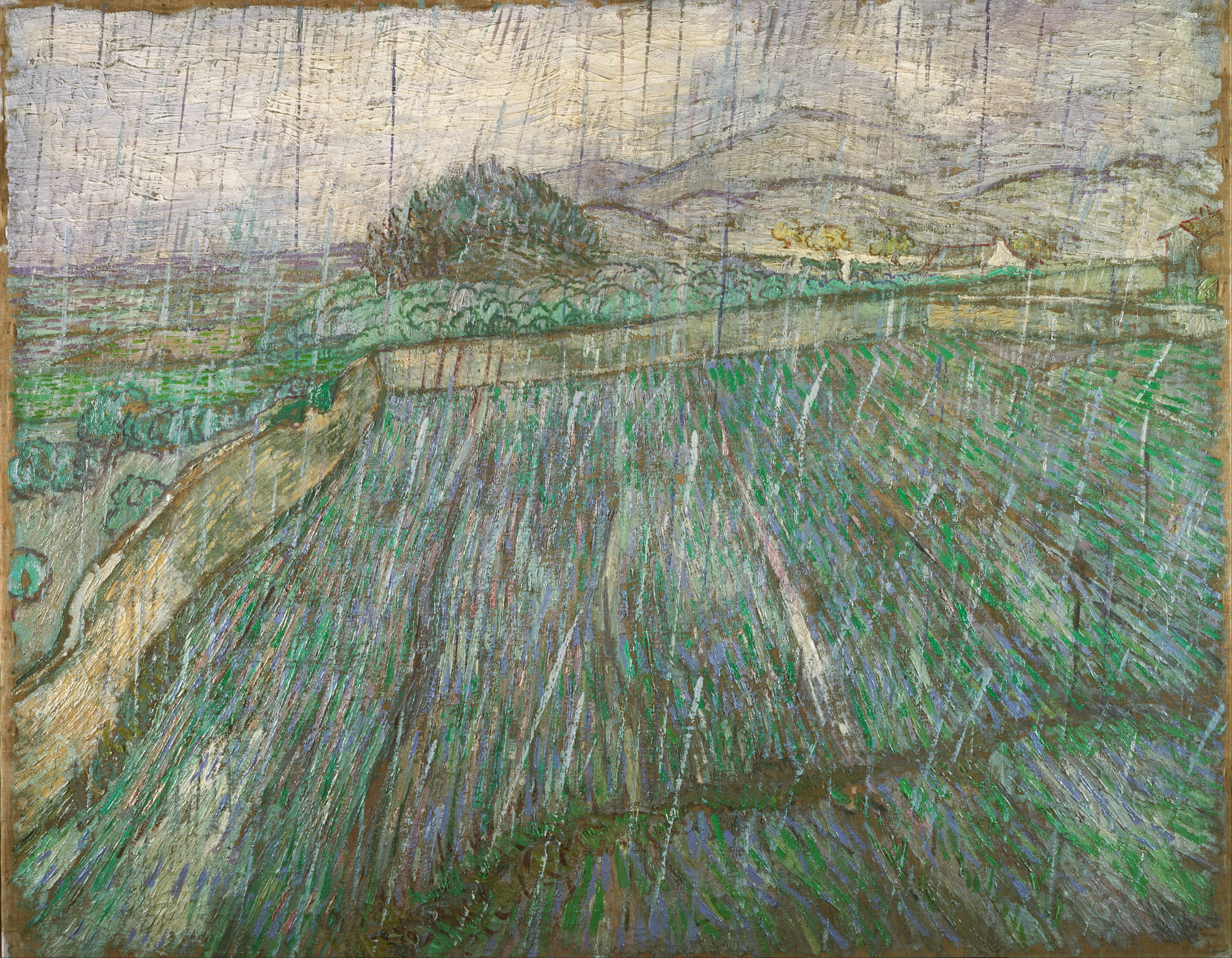
Rain or Enclosed Wheat Field in the Rain, November 1889, Philadelphia Museum of Art, Philadelphia (F650)

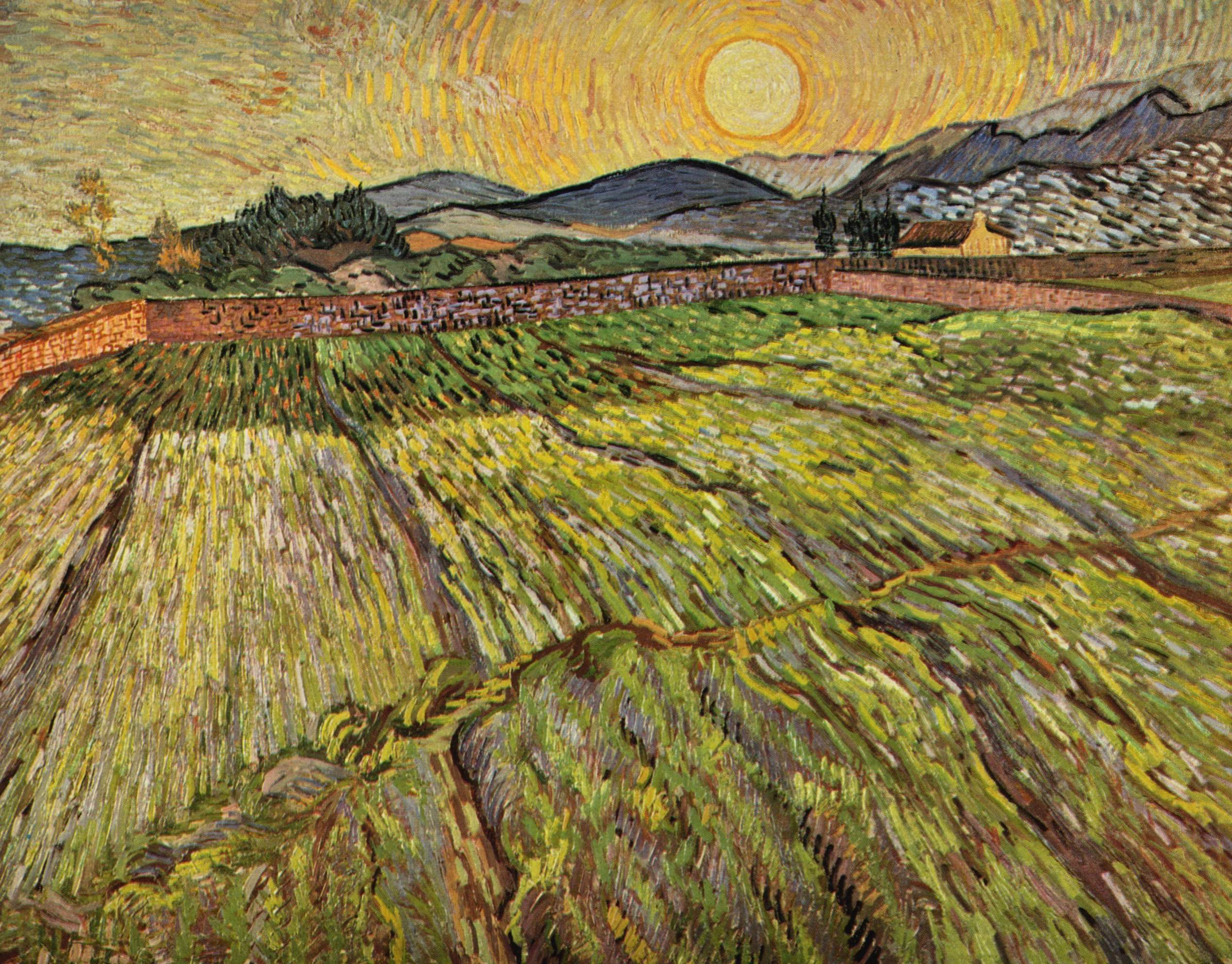
Enclosed Field with Rising Sun also The Wheat Field, December 1889, Private Collection (F737)

=== Wheat Field with Cypresses ===
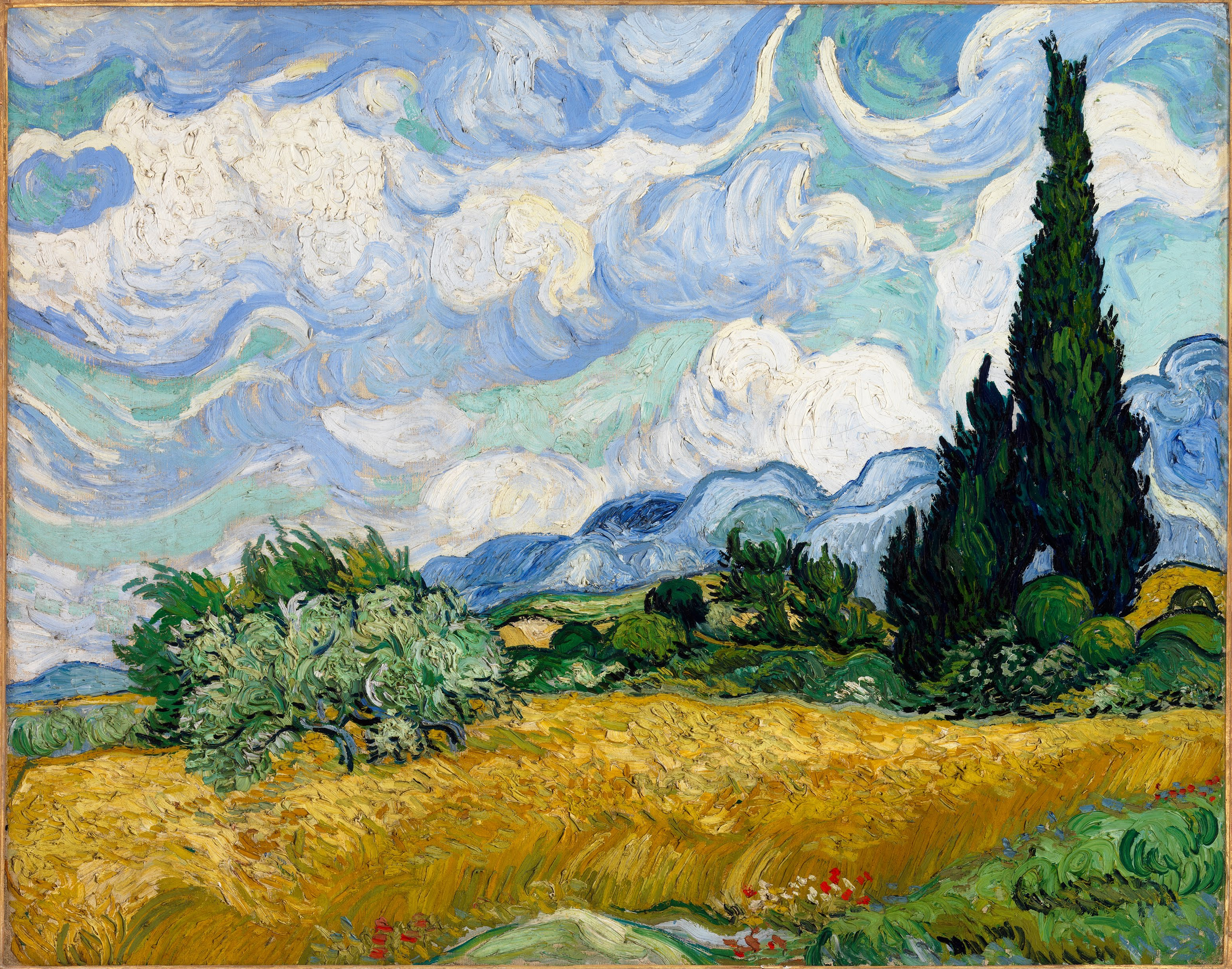
Wheat Field with Cypresses, June–July 1889, Oil on canvas, 73 x 93.4 cm, Metropolitan Museum of Art, New York (F717)

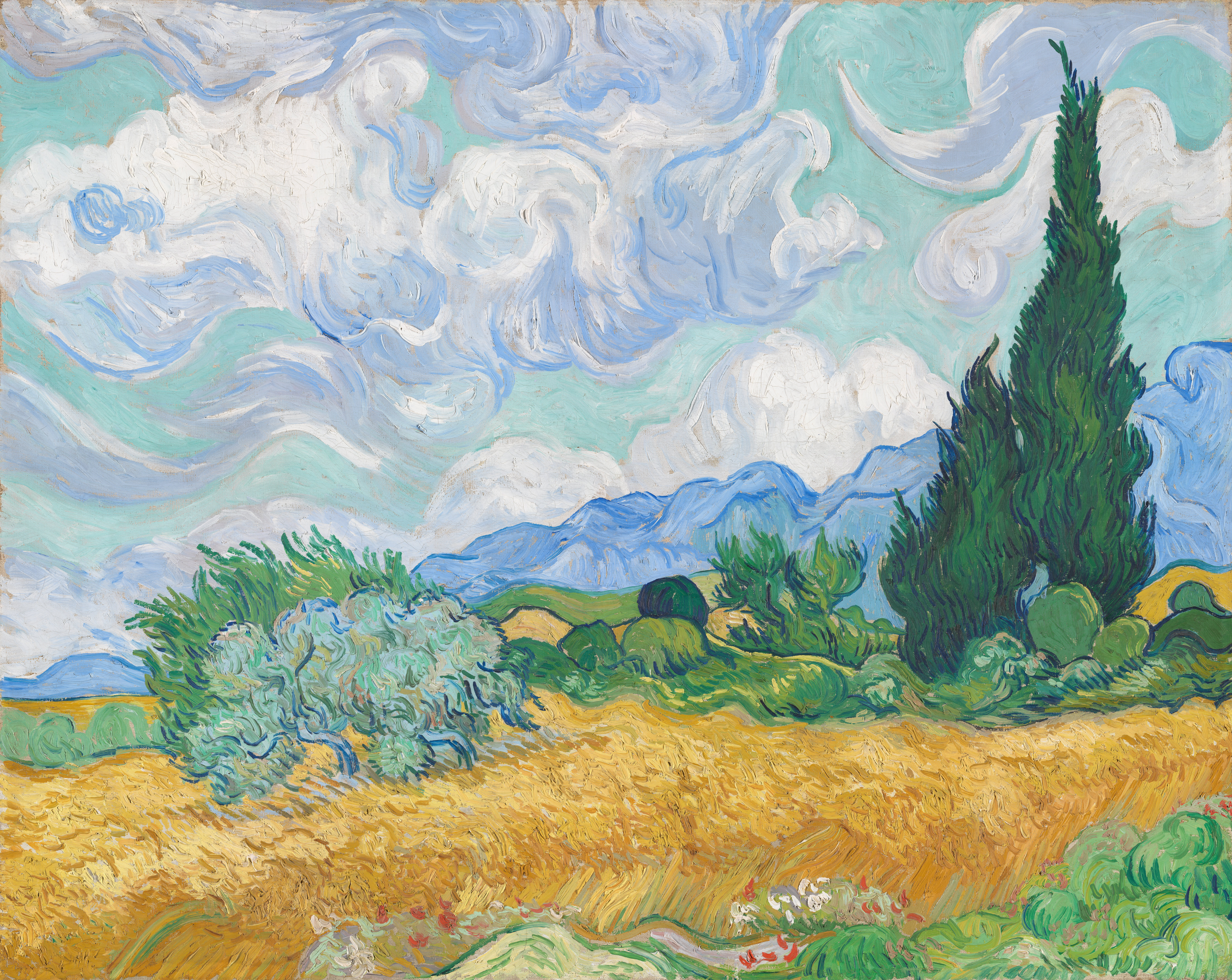
A Wheat Field, with Cypresses, September 1889, National Gallery, London (F615)

The Wheat Field with Cypresses paintings were made when Van Gogh was able to leave the asylum. Van Gogh had a fondness for cypresses and wheat fields of which he wrote: "Only I have no news to tell you, for the days are all the same, I have no ideas, except to think that a field of wheat or a cypress well worth the trouble of looking at closeup."

In early July Van Gogh wrote to his brother Theo of a work he began in June, Wheat Field with Cypresses: "I have a canvas of cypresses with some ears of wheat, some poppies, a blue sky like a piece of Scotch plaid; the former painted with a thick impasto . . . and the wheat field in the sun, which represents the extreme heat, very thick too." Van Gogh who regarded this landscape as one of his "best" summer paintings made two additional oil paintings very similar in composition that fall. One of the two is in a private collection.

London's National Gallery A Wheat Field, with Cypresses painting was made in September which author H.W. Janson describes: "the field is like a stormy sea; the trees spring flamelike from the ground; and the hills and clouds heave with the same surge of motion. Every stroke stands out boldly in a long ribbon of strong, unmixed color."

There is also another version of Wheat Fields with Cypresses made in September with a blue-green sky, reportedly held at the Tate Gallery in London (F743).

=== Other wheat field paintings ===
Van Gogh describes the ripening Green Wheat Field with Cypress painted in June: "a field of wheat turning yellow, surrounded by blackberry bushes and green shrubs. At the end of the field there is a little house with a tall somber cypress which stands out against the far-off hills with their violet-like and bluish tones, and against a sky the color of forget-me-nots with pink streaks, whose pure hues form a contrast with the scorched ears, which are already heavy, and have the warm tones of a bread crust."

In October van Gogh made Enclosed Wheat Field with Ploughman.

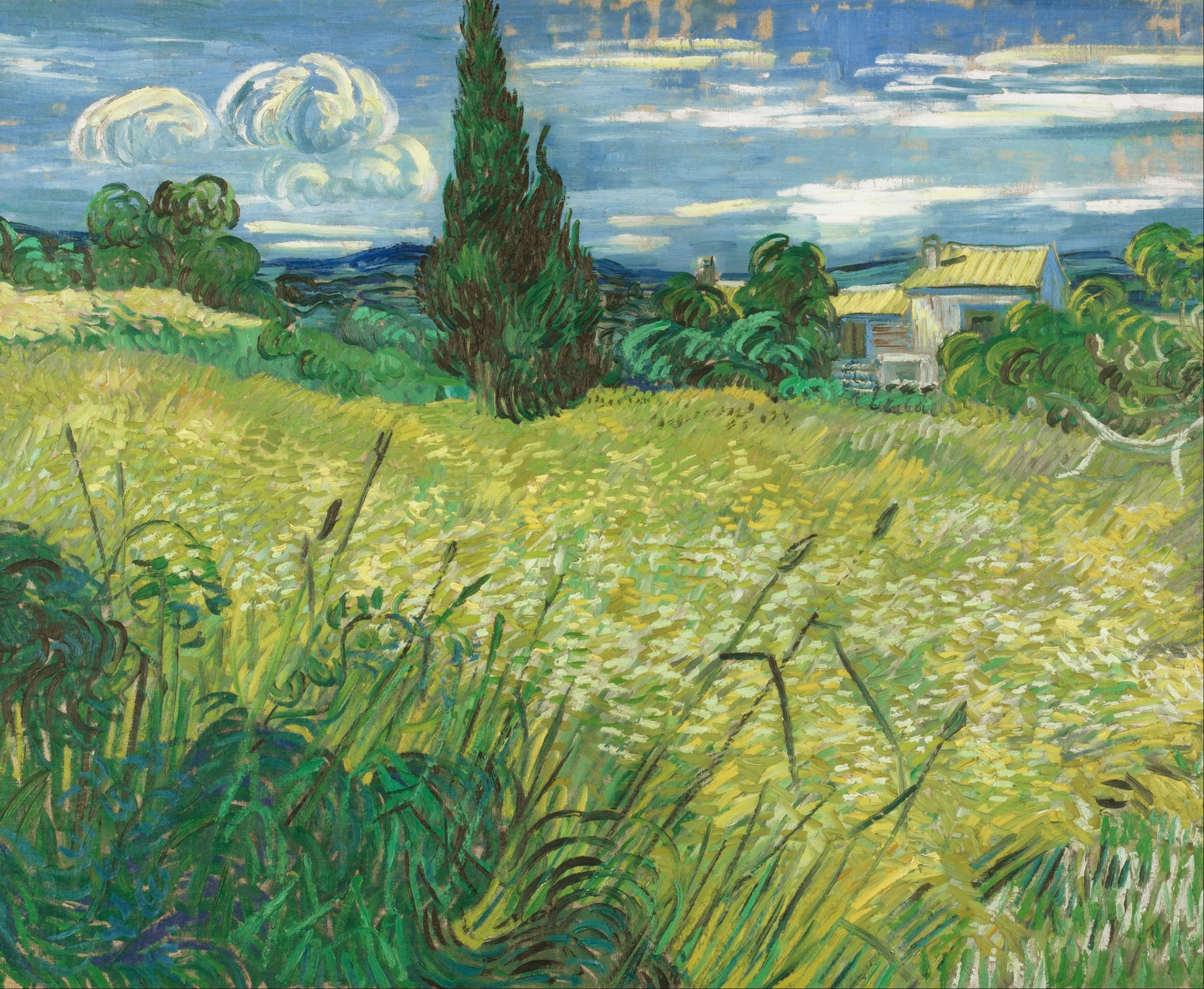
Green Wheat Field with Cypress, 1889, Narodni Gallery, Prague (F719)

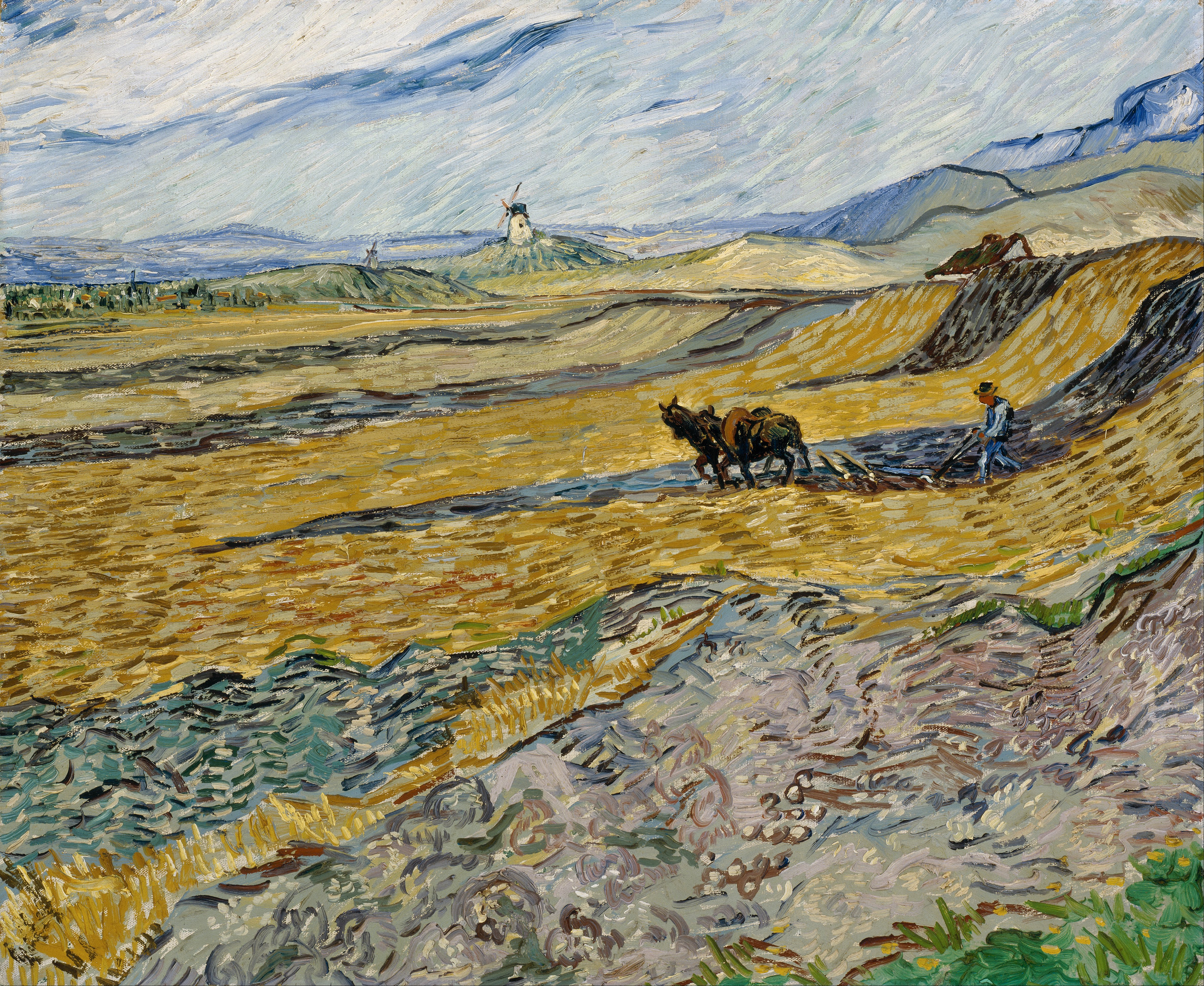
Enclosed Wheat Field with Ploughman, October 1889, Museum of Fine Arts, Boston (F706)

Wheat Fields in a Mountainous Landscape, also titled Meadow in the Mountains was painted in late November - early December 1889.

In November, Wheat Field Behind Saint-Paul was painted by Van Gogh, now owned by Virginia Museum of Fine Arts.

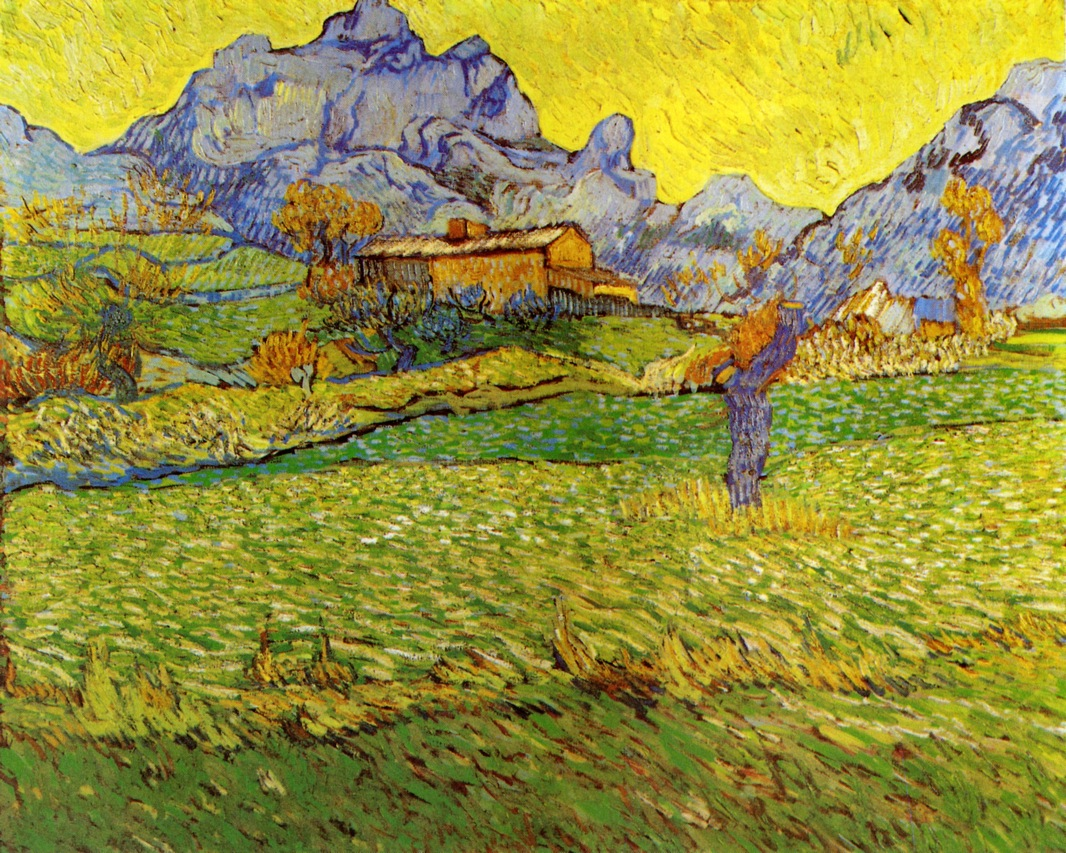
Wheat Fields in a Mountainous Landscape, Late November-Early December 1889, Kröller-Müller Museum, Otterlo, Netherlands (F721)

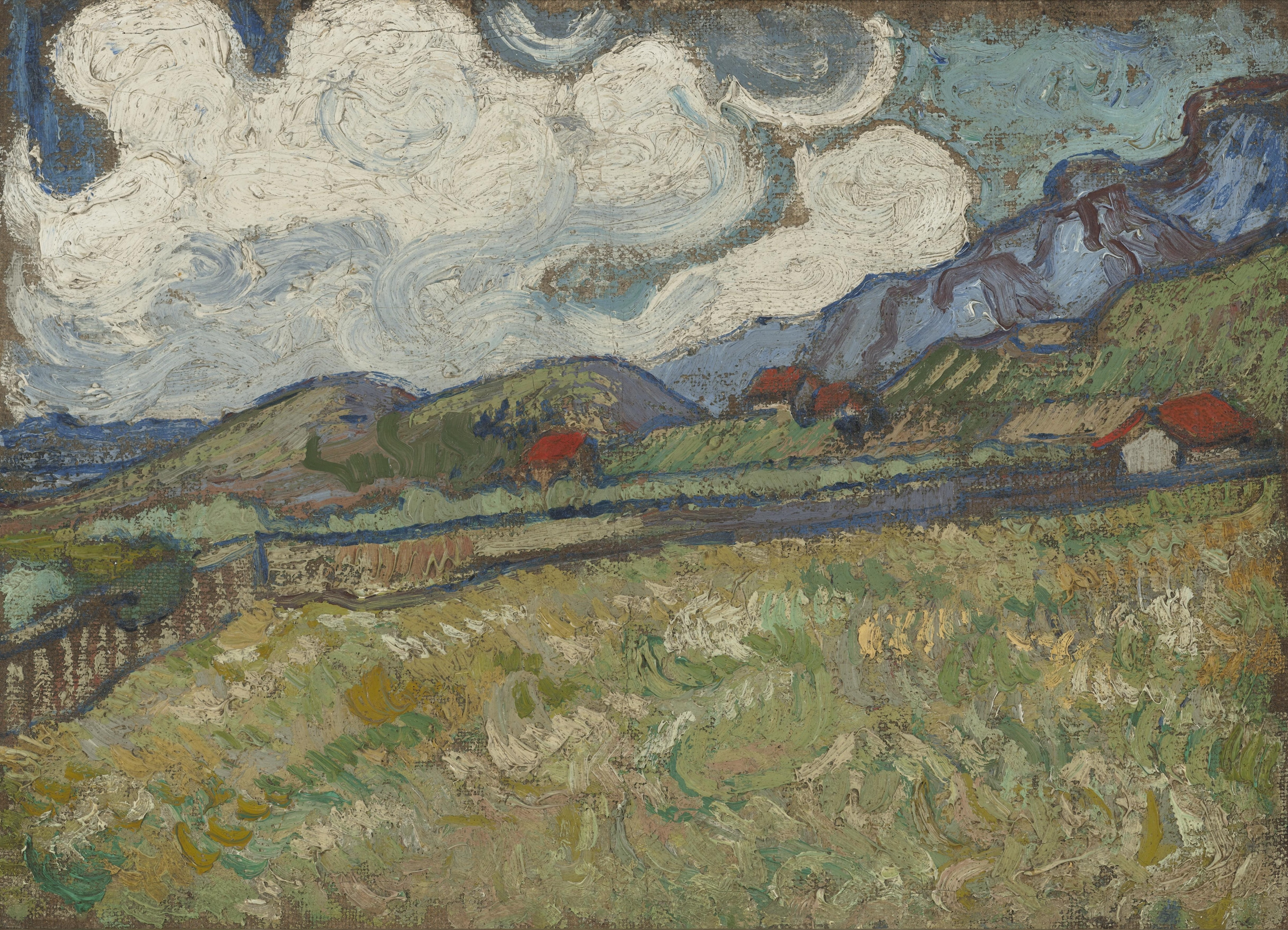
Wheat Field Behind Saint-Paul, November 1889, Virginia Museum of Fine Arts, Richmond, Virginia (F722)

== See also ==
- List of works by Vincent van Gogh
