= Enclosed Field with Peasant =

Painting by Vincent van Gogh

- Artist: Vincent van Gogh
- Year: 1889
- Catalogue: F641; JH1795
- Medium: oil on canvas
- Dimensions: 74 cm × 92.1 cm (29 in × 36.25 in)
- Location: Indianapolis Museum of Art; Indianapolis, Indiana

Enclosed Field with Peasant (also known as Landscape at Saint-Rémy or Ploughed field with a man carrying a bundle of straw, F641, JH1795) is an oil painting by Dutch artist Vincent van Gogh, painted around 12 October 1889. The Size 30 painting, measuring 73 cm × 92 cm (29 in × 36 in), depicts a scene of a ploughed field near the asylum at Saint-Rémy-de-Provence, with a lilac bush, a peasant carrying a wheatsheaf, several buildings, and the Alpilles mountains rising behind, with a small patch of sky. Van Gogh considered it a pendant painting to The Reaper executed earlier in 1889. It is currently part of the permanent collection at the Indianapolis Museum of Art.

== Description ==
Enclosed Field with Peasant is an example of Van Gogh's late work, where his dynamic brush strokes take control of the paintings. The painting's hurried lines accentuate a vibrant, moving field. The painting seems to pulsate with life, even though only one human is shown. It is the most topographically accurate of van Gogh's four views of a wheat field at the base of the Alpilles.

It was created en plein air over several days, during one of the most tumultuous parts of Van Gogh's life, shortly after he resumed painting after he had voluntarily committed himself to an asylum in Saint-Rémy. He was recuperating from a nervous breakdown he suffered on Christmas Eve in 1888, during a visit with fellow postimpressionist Paul Gauguin.

He described the painting in two letters written in October 1889, one to Émile Bernard, as "a no. 30 canvas with broken lilac ploughed fields and a background of mountains that go all the way up the canvas; so nothing but rough ground and rocks, with a thistle and dry grass in a corner, and a little violet and yellow man", and another to his brother, Theo van Gogh, as "the same field as the one of the reaper. Now it’s mounds of earth and the background parched lands, then the rocks of the Alpilles. A bit of blue-green sky with small white and violet cloud. In the foreground: A thistle and some dry grass. A peasant dragging a bundle of straw in the middle. It’s another harsh study, and instead of being almost entirely yellow it makes an almost completely violet canvas. Broken and neutral violets … I think that this will complement the reaper and will make it easier to see what it is. For the reaper appears done at random, and this with it will balance it.".

== Reception ==
Van Gogh sent the painting to his brother Theo in January 1890, along with a letter which described it as "Ploughed Field, with background of mountains", and again suggested that this violet-toned work could be a pendant with his yellow-dominated painting of The Reaper. Van Gogh had made a Size 30 version of The Reaper (also known as Wheat Field with Reaper and Sun, F617) in June 1889, which is now held by the Kröller-Müller Museum in Otterlo. He also made two similar versions of The Reaper in September and October 1889: a second Size 30 version (F618) is held by the Van Gogh Museum, and a smaller Size 20 version (F619) held by the Museum Folkwang in Essen.

Enclosed Field with Peasant was retained by Theo after Vincent's death later in 1890, and inherited on Theo's own death several months later by his widow, Johanna van Gogh-Bonger. In May 1905, it was bought and then exhibited by the art dealer Paul Cassirer in Berlin, where it was sold to the German banker Robert von Mendelssohn. Upon his death in 1917, it was inherited by his wife Giulietta (who was the daughter of Michele Gordigiani); and upon her death in 1955, it was passed to their children, Elenora and Francesco von Mendelssohn, who emigrated to the US in 1935 and 1933 respectively, taking the painting with them.

The painting was consigned to Justin Thannhauser in New York, from where it was sold to Caroline Marmon Fesler. She donated the painting, in memory of Daniel W. Marmon and Elizabeth C. Marmon, to the John Herron Art Institute, now known as the Indianapolis Museum of Art, in 1944.

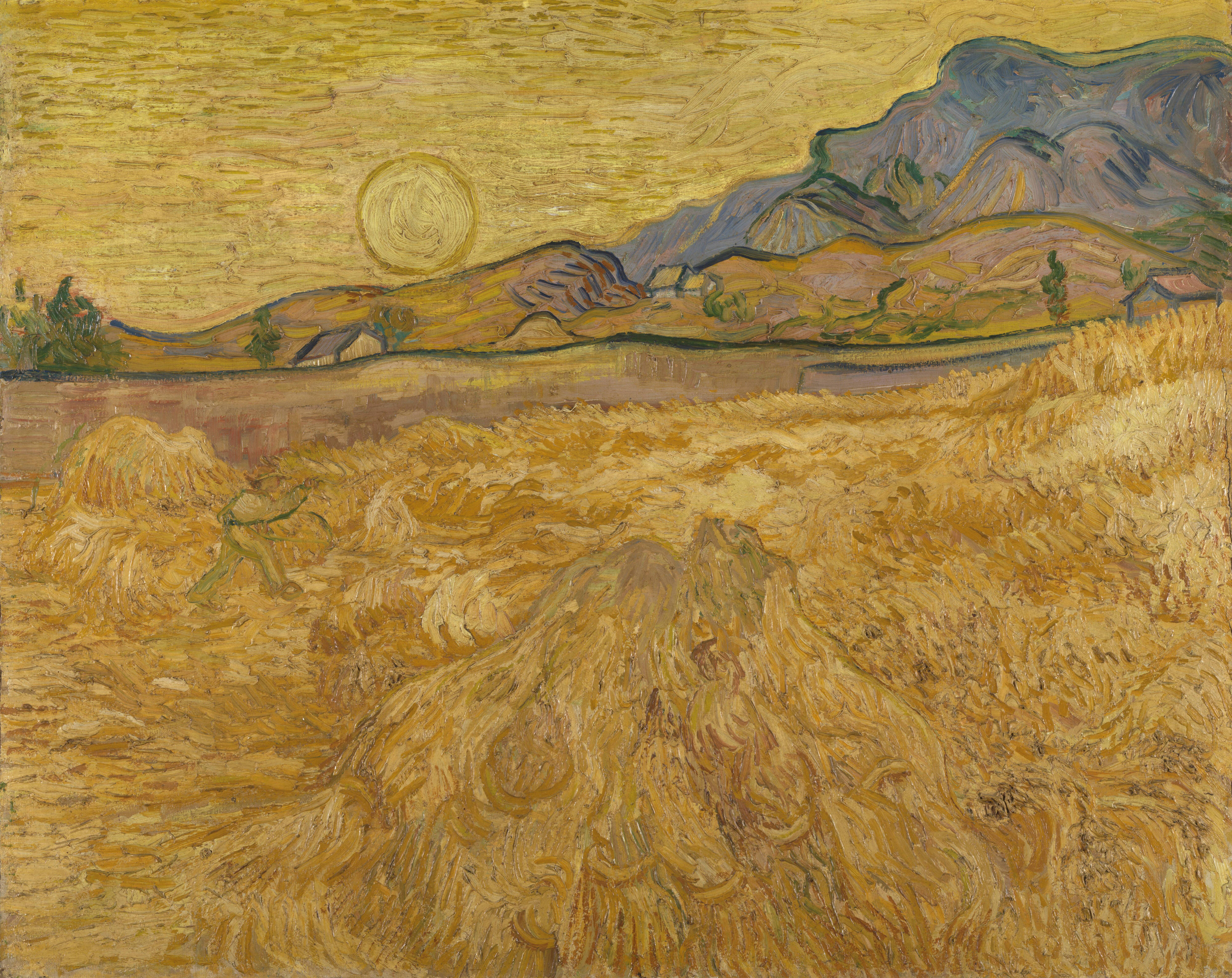
Wheat Field with Reaper and Sun, late June 1889, Oil on canvas, Kröller-Müller Museum, Otterlo, Netherlands (F617)

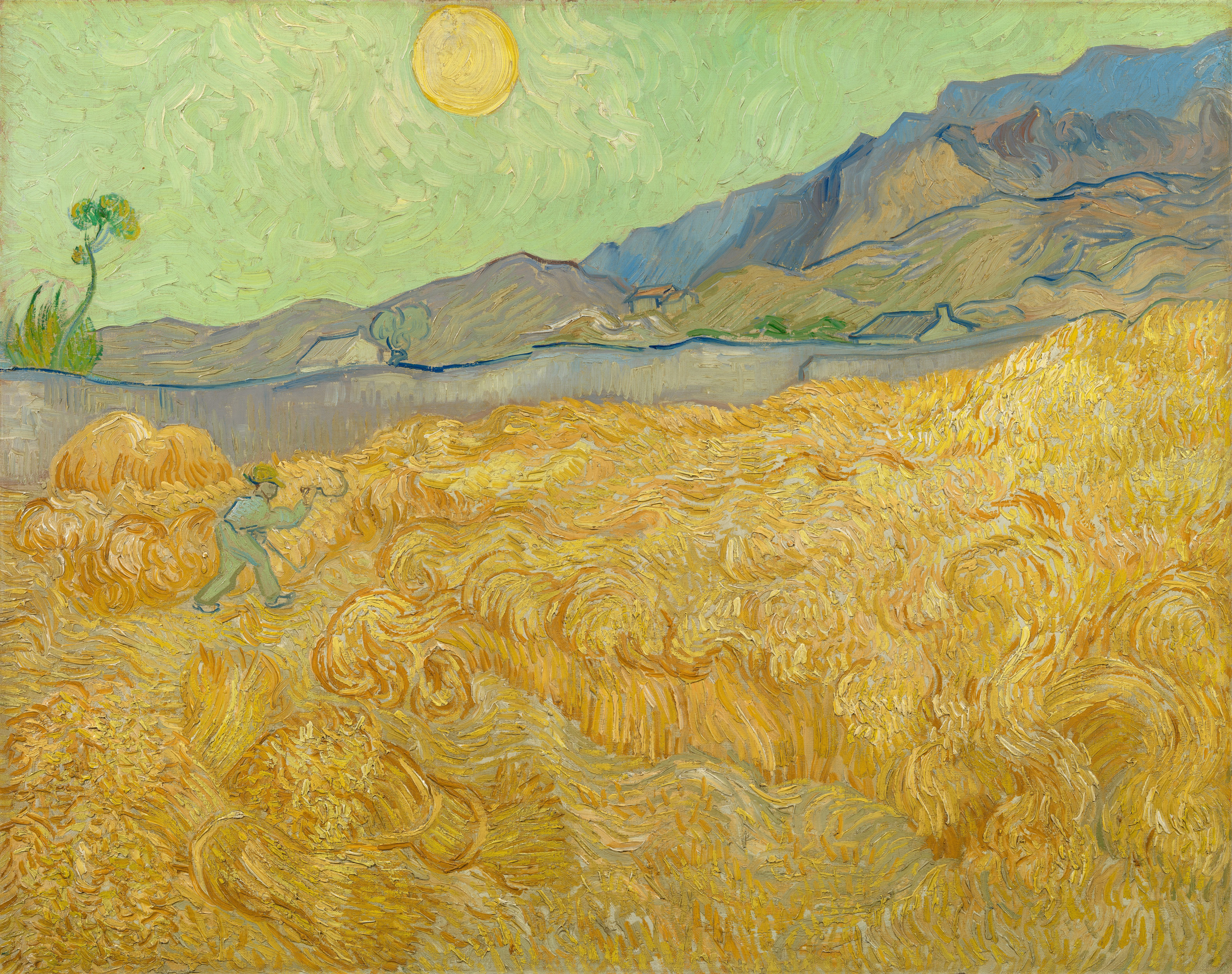
Wheat Field with Reaper, September 1889, Van Gogh Museum, Amsterdam (F618)

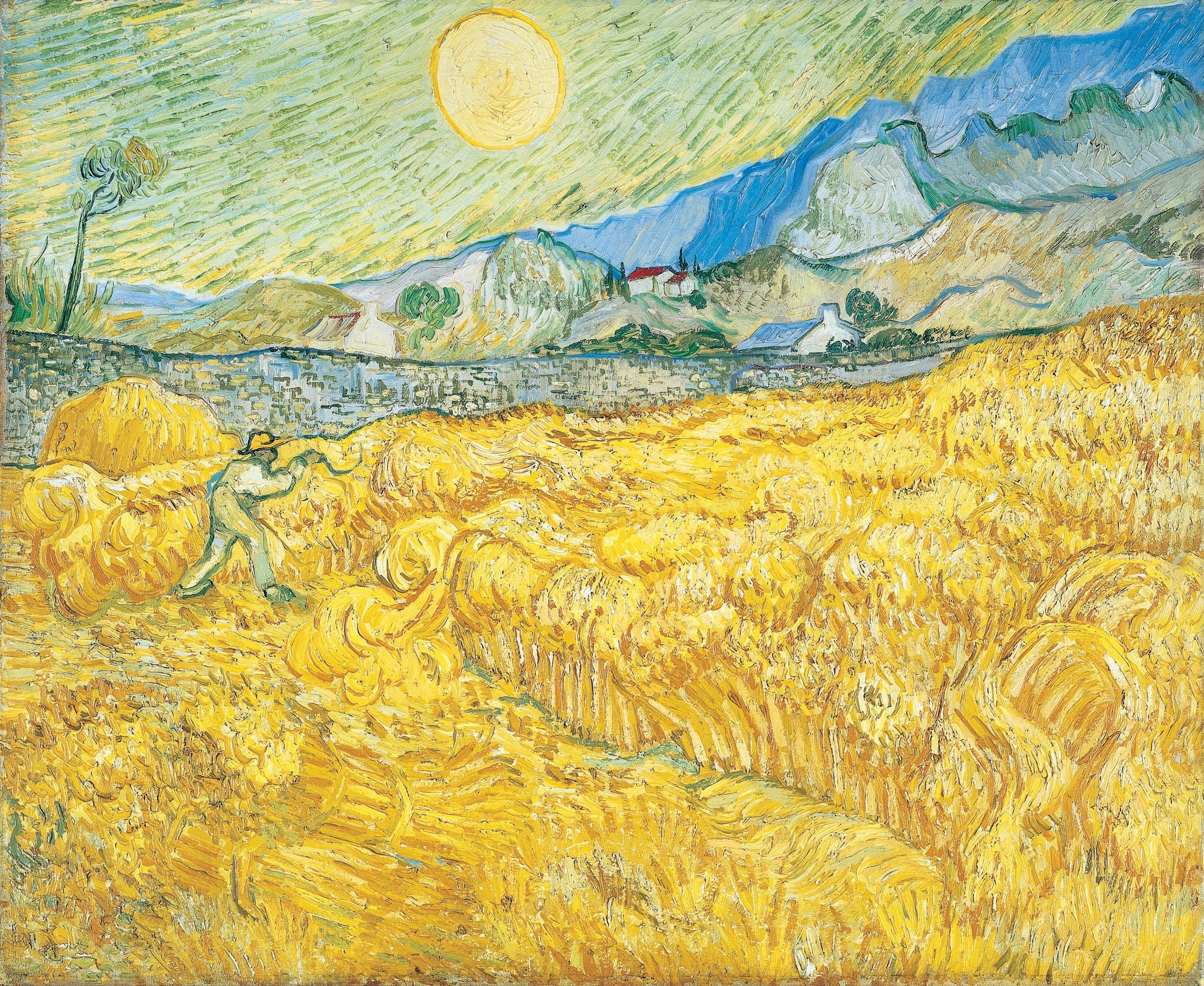
Wheat Field behind Saint-Paul with Reaper, September 1889, Museum Folkwang, Essen (F619)

Landscape at Saint-Rémy (Enclosed Field with Peasant), early October 1889, Indianapolis Museum of Art, Indianapolis, Indiana (F641)

== See also ==
- List of works by Vincent van Gogh
