= Reaper (Van Gogh series) =

1889 series of three paintings

The Wheatfield Behind Saint Paul's Hospital with a Reaper
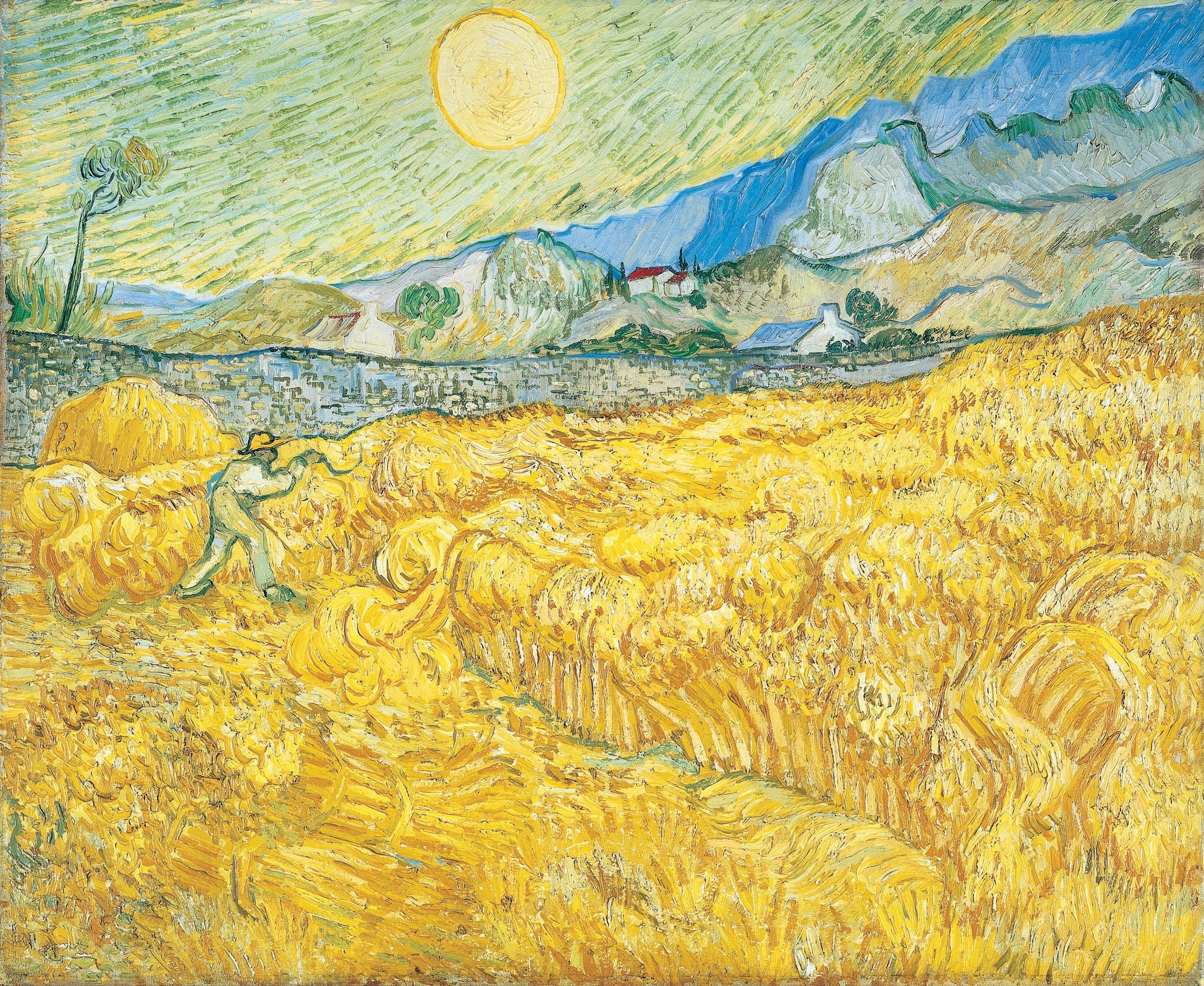
- Third painting (F619), now in the Museum Folkwang, Essen
- Artist: Vincent van Gogh
- Year: 1889
- Catalogue: F617, F618, F619, F1546
- Medium: Oil on canvas

Reaper (French: faucheur, lit. 'reaper'; otherwise known as Wheat Field with Reaper and Sun, Wheat Field with a Reaper, or The Wheatfield Behind Saint Paul's Hospital with a Reaper) is the title given to each of a series of three oil-on-canvas paintings by Vincent van Gogh of a man reaping a wheat field under a bright early-morning sun. To the artist, the reaper represented death and "humanity would be the wheat being reaped". However, Van Gogh did not consider the work to be sad but "almost smiling" and taking "place in broad daylight with a sun that floods everything with a light of fine gold".

The series is part of a larger collection of paintings of wheat fields by Van Gogh, and one of at least 14 paintings of the wheat field at Saint-Paul-de-Mausole. The first painting (F617) in the series is thickly impastoed and was started in June 1889. Work on the piece resumed in early September following the artist's weeks-long recovery from a mental breakdown. Van Gogh then created two more stylized versions (F618 and F619) in early and late September 1889. He referred to the paintings as simply faucheur, 'reaper', and said that the first was done from nature as a study, while the second, similarly sized version was "the final painting" completed in studio. While he initially preferred the second version over the study, he eventually concluded that the earlier painting was better. He intended the third, smaller version as a keepsake for his mother or one of his sisters.

== Background ==
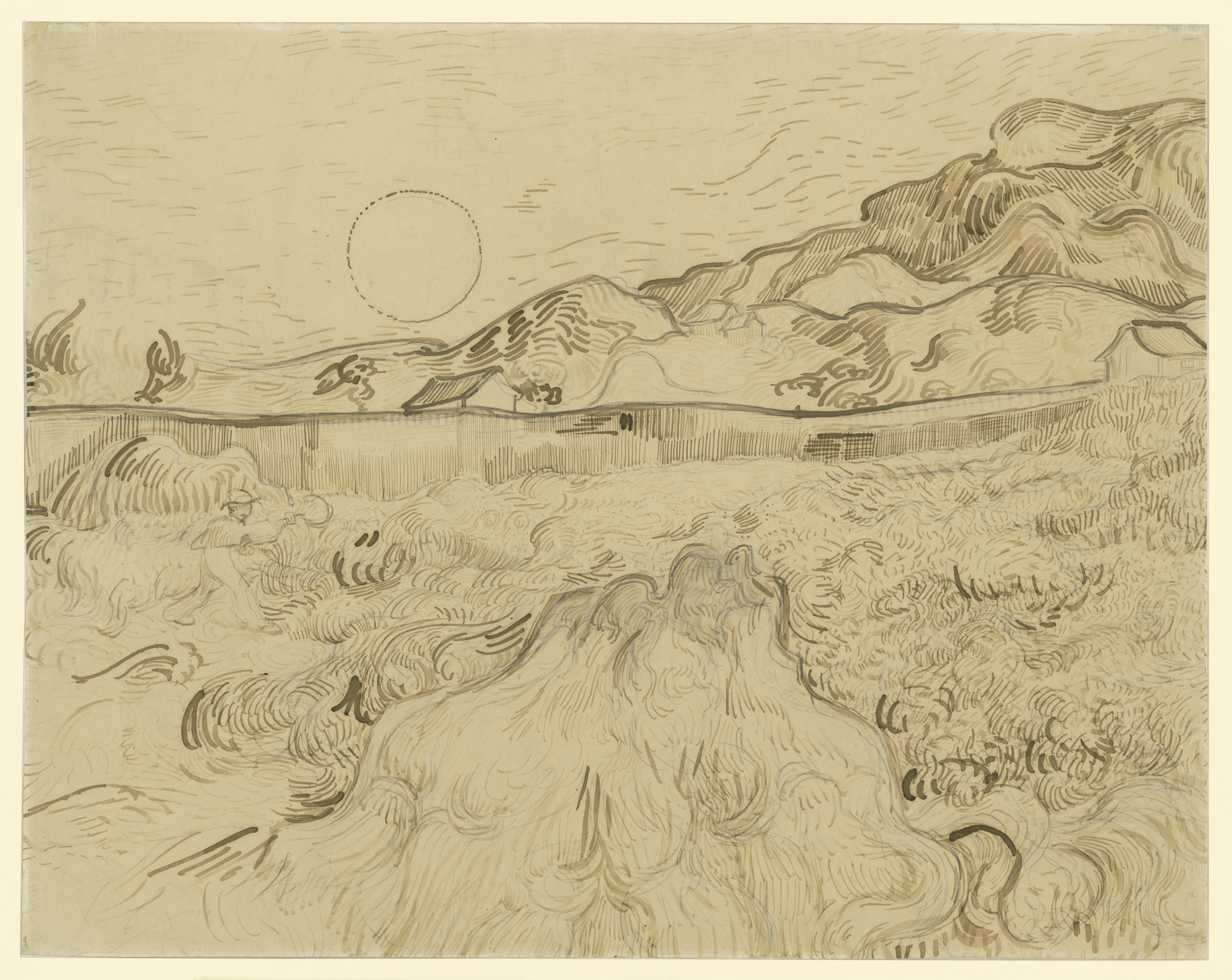
Sketch (F1546) after F617, sent with a 2 July 1889 letter to his brother

In May 1889, Vincent van Gogh (1853–1890), a Dutch painter, moved to the Saint-Rémy-de-Provence, France, to commit himself at Saint-Paul-de-Mausole, a psychiatric asylum which was previously a monastery. This presented Van Gogh with a completely different landscape from which to draw inspiration. While Saint-Remy was only 25 kilometres (16 miles) from Arles, his previous residence, it lies below the low massifs of the Alpilles in contrast to the vast plains of Arles.

Van Gogh's bedroom window framed a view of an agrarian landscape that became the focus of the artist's work. A wheat field was located below his window, encircled by a wall and hills in the background. The artist made at least 14 paintings and just as many sketches of the scene.

== Composition ==
=== First painting (F617) ===
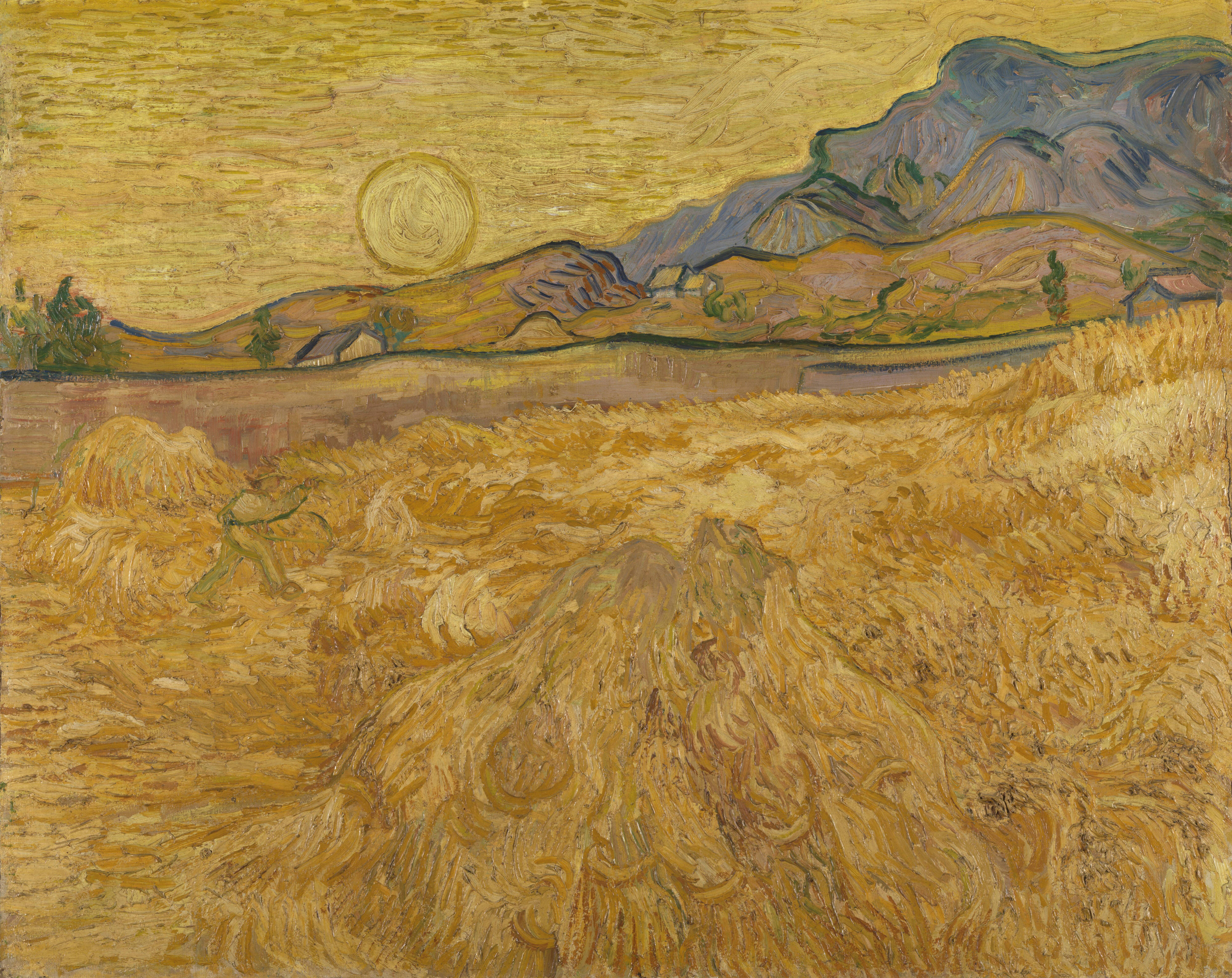
First painting (F617), now in the Kröller-Müller Museum, Otterlo

Van Gogh began painting Reaper (F617) in late June 1889. He first mentions the painting in a 25 June 1889 letter to his brother Theo van Gogh where he describes it as "a wheatfield, very yellow and very bright, perhaps the brightest canvas [he has] done". He writes that it was among 12 paintings on which he was currently working. The painting is mentioned again in a 2 July 1889 letter:

The latest one begun is the wheatfield where there's a little reaper and a big sun. The canvas is all yellow with the exception of the wall and the background of purplish hills.

In the painting measuring 73 cm × 92 cm (29 in × 36 in), the reaper is depicted with just a few brushstrokes of blue in swirling yellow wheat that leaves an outline of the figure in green. His sickle is only a single brushstroke and barely visible.

With the 2 July letter, Van Gogh included around ten sketches of the paintings he was working on at the time, including a sketch (F1546) of this painting. The painting appears to have been mostly completed by then. However, Van Gogh was making further changes to the work while he described it in more detail in a later letter to his brother written on 4–5 September 1889:

I'm struggling with a canvas begun a few days before my indisposition. A reaper, the study is all yellow, terribly thickly [impastoed], but the subject was beautiful and simple. I then saw in this reaper – a vague figure struggling like a devil in the full heat of the day to reach the end of his toil – I then saw the image of death in it, in this sense that humanity would be the wheat being reaped. So if you like it's the opposite of that Sower I tried before. But in this death [there is] nothing sad, it takes place in broad daylight with a sun that floods everything with a light of fine gold. Good, here I am again, however I'm not letting go, and I'm trying again on a new canvas.

Before writing the letter quoted above, the artist had suffered a severe mental breakdown. In July 1889, he was confined in the asylum for six weeks and was only permitted to paint again in late August. While writing the 4–5 September letter, he touched up the first painting, which he described as a study, and began working on a new version.

=== Second painting (F618) ===
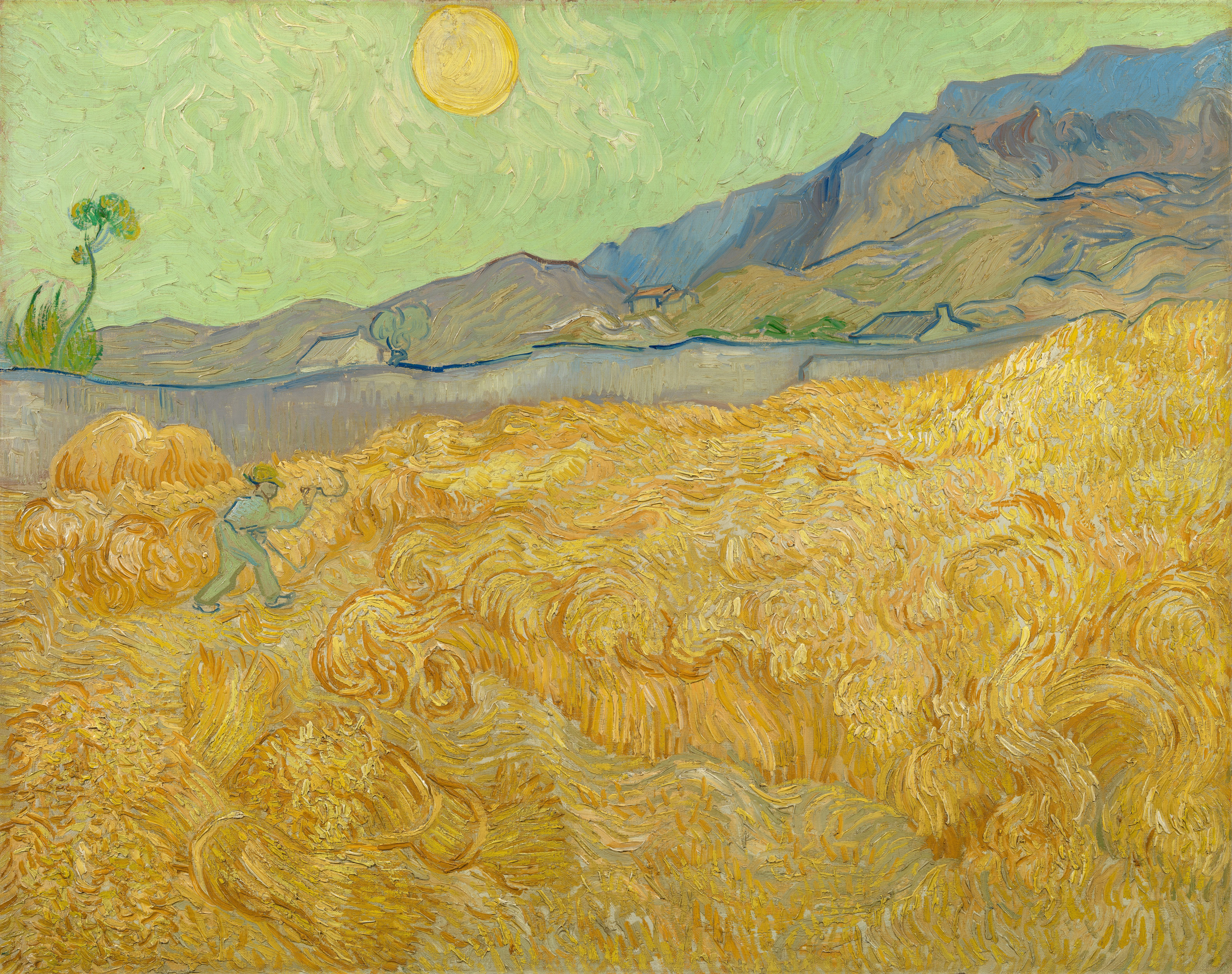
Second painting (F618), Van Gogh Museum, Amsterdam

Van Gogh appears to have completed the second painting in a single day and taking breaks to write the letter on 4–5 September 1889. In a later part of the letter, he announces: "Phew – the reaper is finished, I think it will be one that you'll place in your home". He initially preferred this version over the earlier study, describing it as:

[A]n image of death as the great Book of Nature speaks to us about it – but what I sought is the "almost smiling". It's all yellow except for a line of violet hills – a pale, blond yellow. I myself find that funny, that I saw it like that through the iron bars of a cell.

The "almost smiling" is a reference to an expression used by art critic Théophile Silvestre to describe the death of painter Eugène Delacroix. Silvestre's eulogy of Delacroix had made an impression on Van Gogh, according to a letter he wrote in 15 August 1885 to the painter Anthon van Rappard. Van Gogh also quoted the eulogy in other letters.

There were significant differences between this second painting and the earlier version from the summer. Van Gogh used on the second version a set of paints he had received in early July – what he called "the palette of the North". The second painting is less yellow, with a sky that is more greenish in color, and the Sun is more conical and higher in the sky. He added a small tree near the left edge of the painting along the background hills and removed the pile of sheaves from the foreground. The second painting, at 73.2 cm × 92.7 cm (28.8 in × 36.5 in), is almost the same size as the first.

Van Gogh came to believe the original painting, created from nature, was better than the replica which he had intended as "the final painting". In a letter to the painter Émile Bernard written in November 1889, Van Gogh said "the effect is weaker" in the second painting, indicating his ultimate preference for the first. Both the first and second version of the painting were still drying on 19 September 1889, and he was unable to include them in the batch he shipped to Theo on that date. The paintings were eventually included in the batch he sent on 28 September, by which time he had completed a third version of the painting.

=== Third painting (F619) ===
In late September 1889, Van Gogh painted reduced versions of several of his earlier works, including a replica of the Reaper similar to the one he made earlier that month, smaller versions of Wheat Field with Cypresses and Bedroom in Arles, and what he called "a little portrait of me", Self-Portrait Without Beard. In particular, he wrote on 6 September 1889: "I really want to redo the reaper one more time for Mother, if not I'll make her another painting for her birthday". This third version of the painting, also known as The Wheatfield Behind Saint Paul's Hospital with a Reaper, or La moisson, 'the harvest', was smaller at 59.5 cm × 72.5 cm (23.4 in × 28.5 in). The painting was completed and drying by 28 September and, in December 1889, was sent to Theo along with several other small replicas.

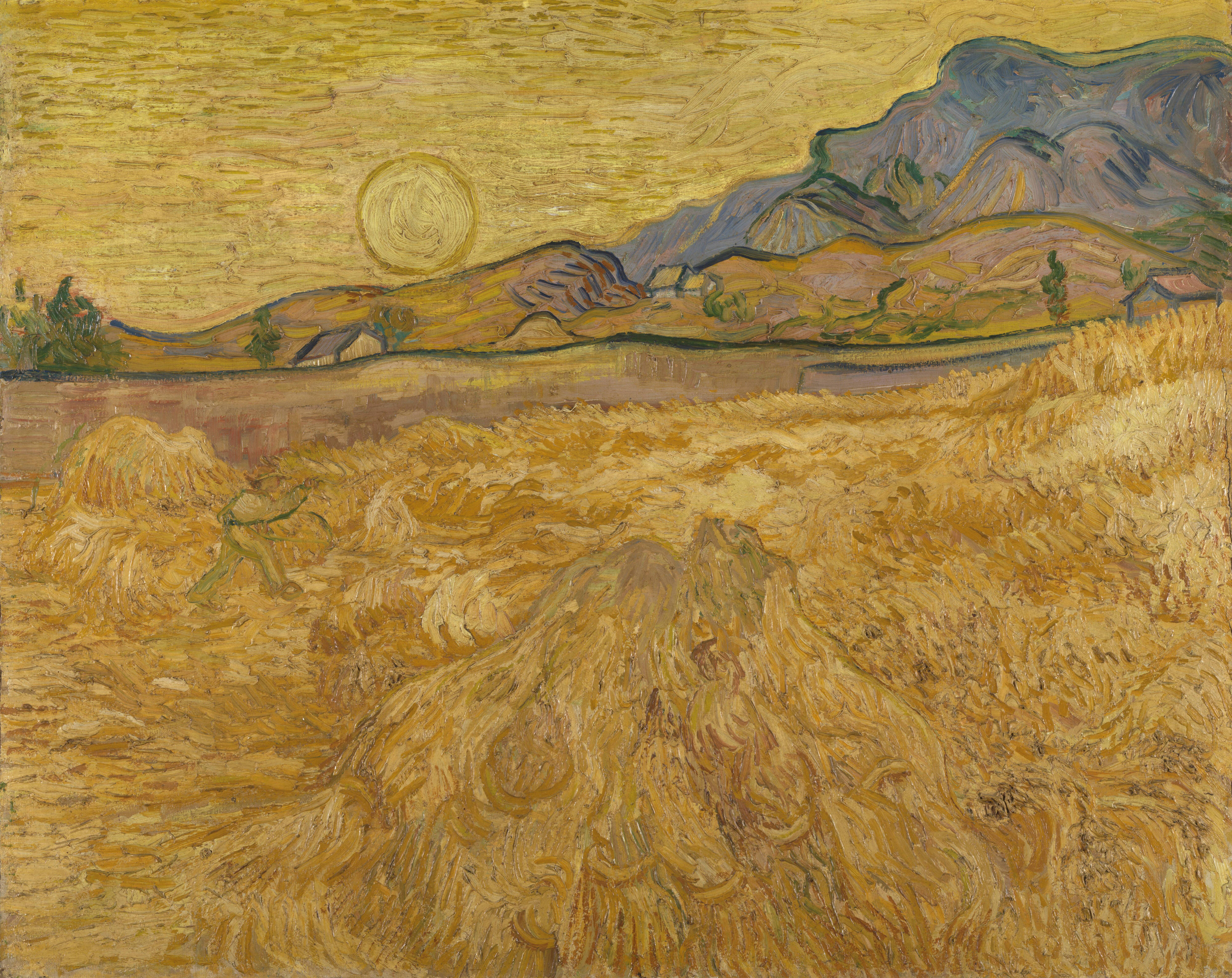
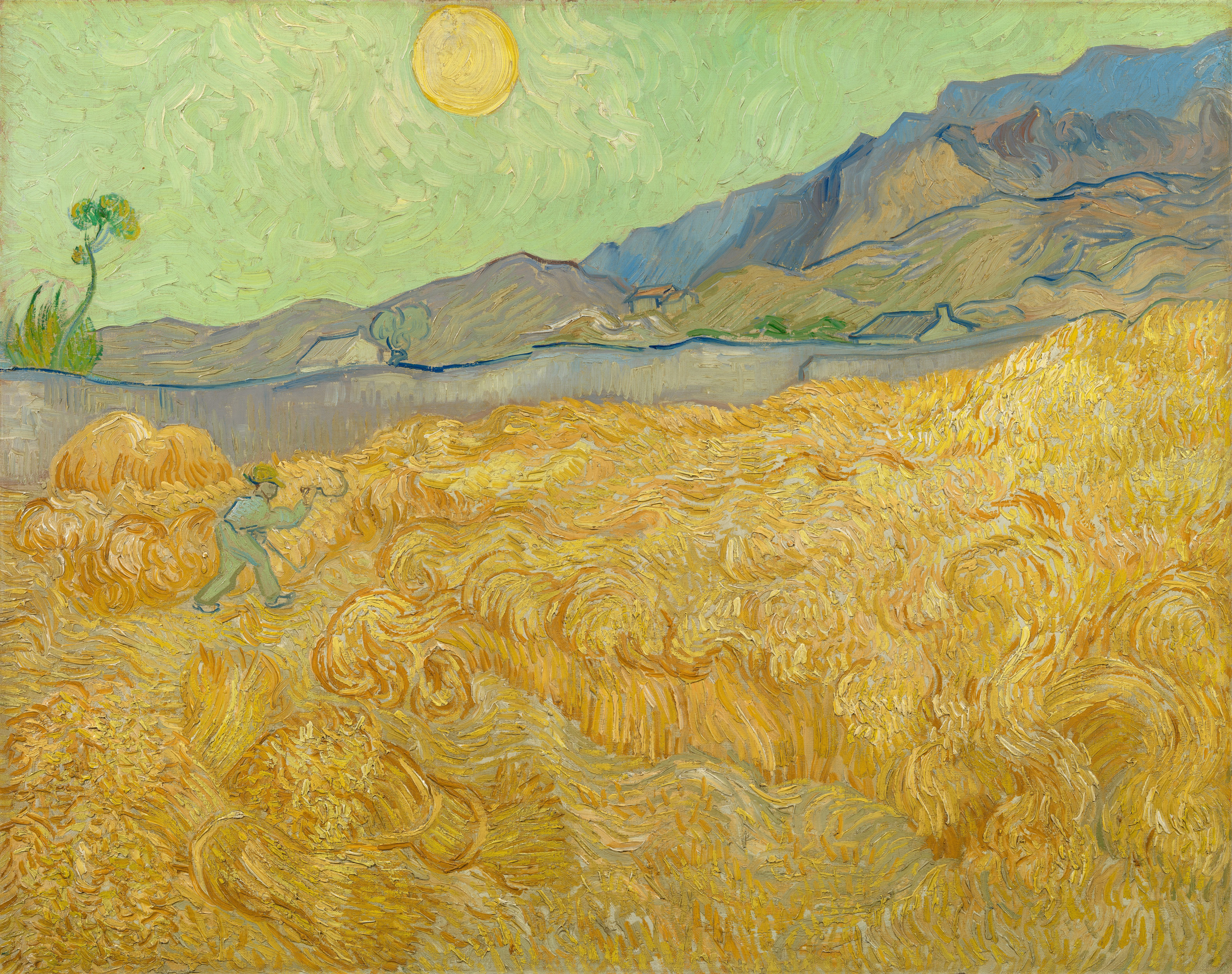
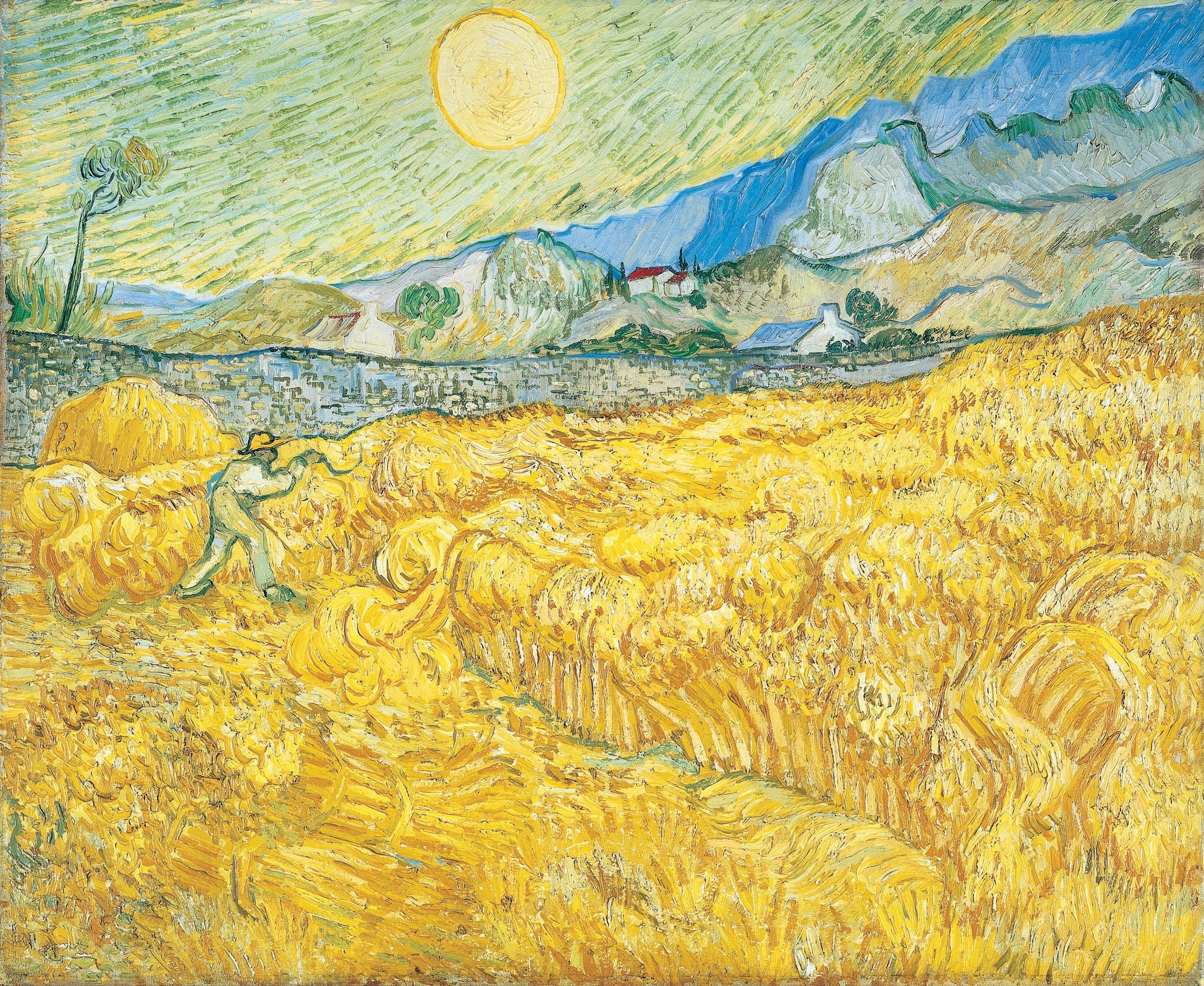
The three paintings to approximate scale

== Reception ==
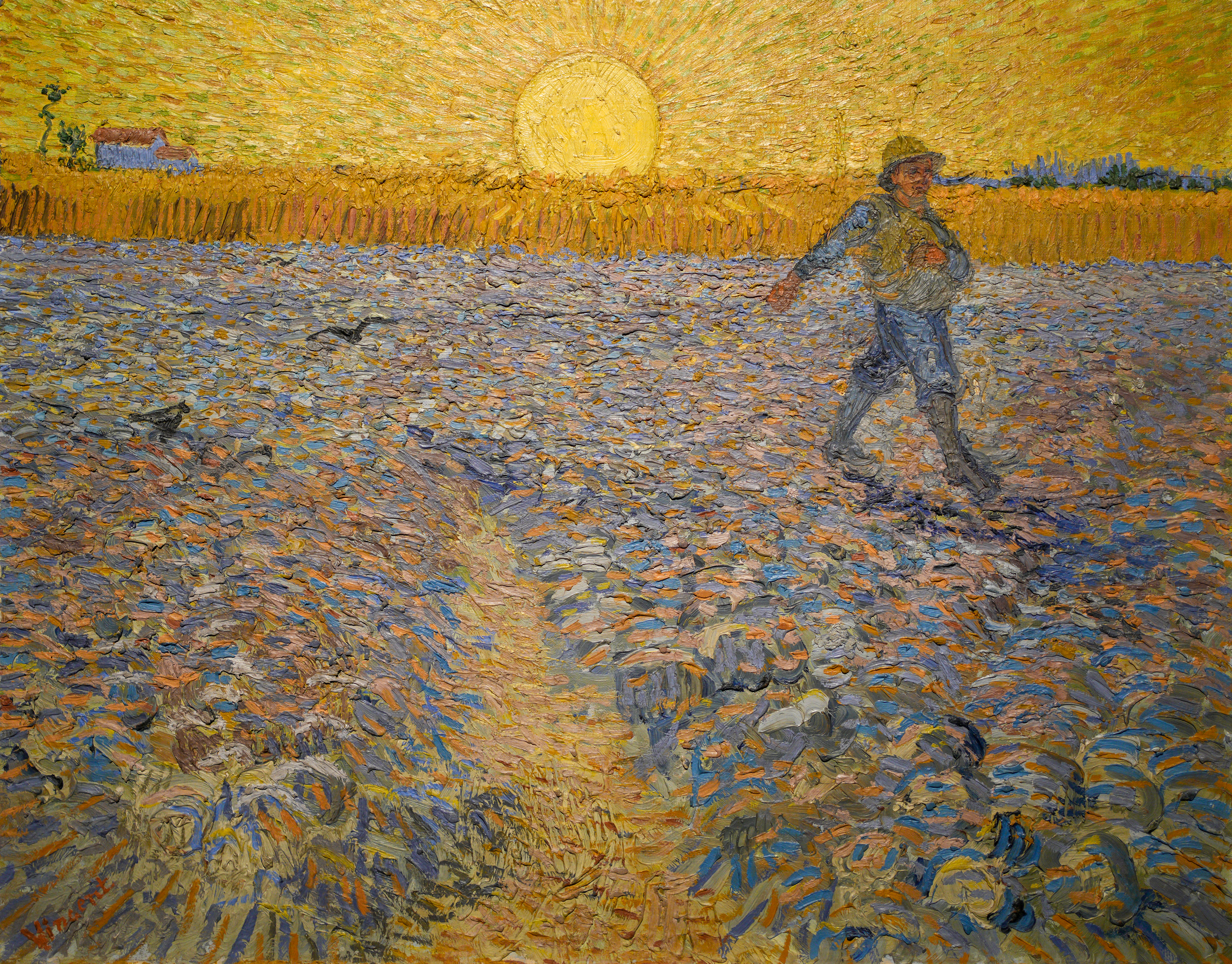
Sower at Sunset (F422), now in the Kröller-Müller Museum, Otterlo

Martin Bailey wrote that The Wheat Field paintings and sketches as a collection, "done in different seasons, at various times of the day, in all weathers and in evolving styles [...] represent a microcosm of the artist's work at Saint-Paul." Comparing the first two paintings in the series, curator Susan Alyson Stein notes the second painting, created "in the studio, is simplified and brightened" as compared to the first painted from nature." Art historian Ronald Pickvance saw Reaper as bringing to full circle the artist's vision of the Sower (F422) painted in Arles; "Creation versus death: two poles of his symbolic imagery, and two of his most haunting statements in paint." In a video review of the second painting, filmmaker and painter Jeroen Krabbé said that the painting's theme of death and motif of the reaper was not just a premonition of the artist's death. Krabbé said,

I rather feel it is a harvesting [...] he was harvesting all the things he had been fighting for all his life. The styles he had tried. Things that hadn't worked. Suddenly everything did work: he was harvesting his craftsmanship. It's the joy of the moment when he could paint again that makes it such a moving picture. You can smell the sun. It is high up in the sky. That bright yellow is made even yellower by the blue mountains behind it, by the mauve behind it, and the green. It's a jubilation picture by a man who was desperate and who used the joy of painting to get him out of his own depression. That is why this is such an incredibly moving masterpiece.

== Provenance ==
Van Gogh died about a year after creating the paintings. His brother, Theo, died a few months later and the two later paintings came to the possession of Theo's widow, Johanna van Gogh-Bonger (later Johanna Cohen Gosschalk-Bonger). The original study was in 1890 either gifted to Paul Gauguin or traded for a work by the French artist. In 1899, the painting was acquired by Ambroise Vollard from Gauguin's art dealer Georges Chaudet. The piece was then acquired by the art collector Émile Schuffenecker, who passed it down to Amédée Schuffenecker, who in turn sold it to Helene Kröller-Müller in April 1912. It has since been in the collection of the Kröller-Müller Museum. The sketch, part of Van Gogh's 2 July 1889 letter to Theo, was in the collection of Otto Wacker until 1928 when it was acquired by the National Gallery in Berlin. It was transferred in 1992 to the Museum of Prints and Drawings, part of the Staatliche Museen zu Berlin.

Van Gogh-Bonger and her son, Vincent Willem van Gogh, loaned the second painting to museums in Amsterdam. In 1909, she loaned the piece to the Rijksmuseum. After her death in 1925, her son continued to loan the piece to the Rijksmuseum. On 22 October 1931, the painting was loaned to the Stedelijk Museum. Ownership of the painting was transferred to the Vincent van Gogh Foundation on 10 July 1962, and eleven days later, an agreement was reached between the foundation and the State of the Netherlands for the preservation and management of the painting as part of a new Van Gogh Museum. While the new museum was being built, the painting remained at Stedelijk until 2 June 1973, when it was placed on permanent loan to the Van Gogh Museum.

While Van Gogh painted the third and smaller version as a gift for either his mother or one of his sisters, it is unknown whether the painting ever reached them. In May 1902, Van Gogh-Bonger sold the third painting to the German art dealer Paul Cassirer, and it became the first work by Van Gogh to be held by a German museum. The same year, art collector Karl Ernst Osthaus of the Museum Folkwang acquired the painting for his collection in Hagen, Germany. Since 1922, it has been a part of the museum's collection in Essen.

== See also ==
- List of works by Vincent van Gogh

== Sources ==
=== Letters ===
- "526 (533, R58): To Anthon van Rappard. Nuenen, between about Saturday, 8 and about Saturday, 15 August 1885". Vincent van Gogh Letters. 15 August 1885. Archived from the original on 7 September 2022.
- "783 (785, 596): To Theo van Gogh. Saint-Rémy-de-Provence, Tuesday, 25 June 1889". Vincent van Gogh Letters. 25 June 1889. Archived from the original on 15 February 2020.
- "784 (786, 597): To Theo van Gogh. Saint-Rémy-de-Provence, Tuesday, 2 July 1889". Vincent van Gogh Letters. 2 July 1889. Archived from the original on 15 February 2020.
- "800 (801, 604): To Theo van Gogh. Saint-Rémy-de-Provence, Thursday, 5 and Friday, 6 September 1889". Vincent van Gogh Letters. 6 September 1889. Archived from the original on 15 February 2020.
- "806 (807, 608): To Theo van Gogh. Saint-Rémy-de-Provence, Saturday, 28 September 1889". Vincent van Gogh Letters. 28 September 1889. Archived from the original on 7 December 2020.
- "824 (826, 618): To Theo van Gogh. Saint-Rémy-de-Provence, Saturday, 7 December 1889". Vincent van Gogh Letters. 7 December 1889. Archived from the original on 15 December 2021.

=== Books ===
- Bailey, Martin (27 August 2018). Starry Night: Van Gogh at the Asylum. White Lion Publishing. ISBN 978-0-7112-3920-3. Archived from the original on 23 December 2021.
- Fiedler, Inge; et al. (1 January 2016). "Materials, Intention, and Evolution". In Groom, Gloria (ed.). Van Gogh's Bedrooms. Yale University Press. ISBN 978-0-300-21486-4.
- Ives, Colta Feller; et al. (2005). Vincent Van Gogh: The Drawings. Metropolitan Museum of Art. ISBN 978-1-58839-165-0. Archived from the original on 23 December 2021.
- Overbeek, Annemiek (1996). Van Gogh Museum: Guide. Van Gogh Museum. ISBN 978-90-400-9886-4.
- Pickvance, Ronald (1986). Van Gogh in Saint-Rémy and Auvers. Metropolitan Museum of Art. ISBN 978-0-87099-477-7. Archived from the original on 23 December 2021.
- Walther, Ingo F.; Metzger, Rainer (2019). Van Gogh: The Complete Paintings. Taschen. ISBN 978-3-8365-4122-0.
- Stein, Susan Alyson (2023). Van Gogh's Cypresses. Metropolitan Museum of Art. ISBN 978-1-58839-759-1.
