= Gasquet =

Gasquet (French pronunciation: [ɡaskɛ]) is a French surname. Notable people with the surname include:

- Francis Aidan Gasquet, English Benedictine monk and cardinal
- Joachim Gasquet, French writer
- Marie Gasquet, French writer
- Richard Gasquet, French tennis player

== See also ==
- Gasquet, California, unincorporated community
