= The Banks of the Marne =

Painting by Paul Cézanne

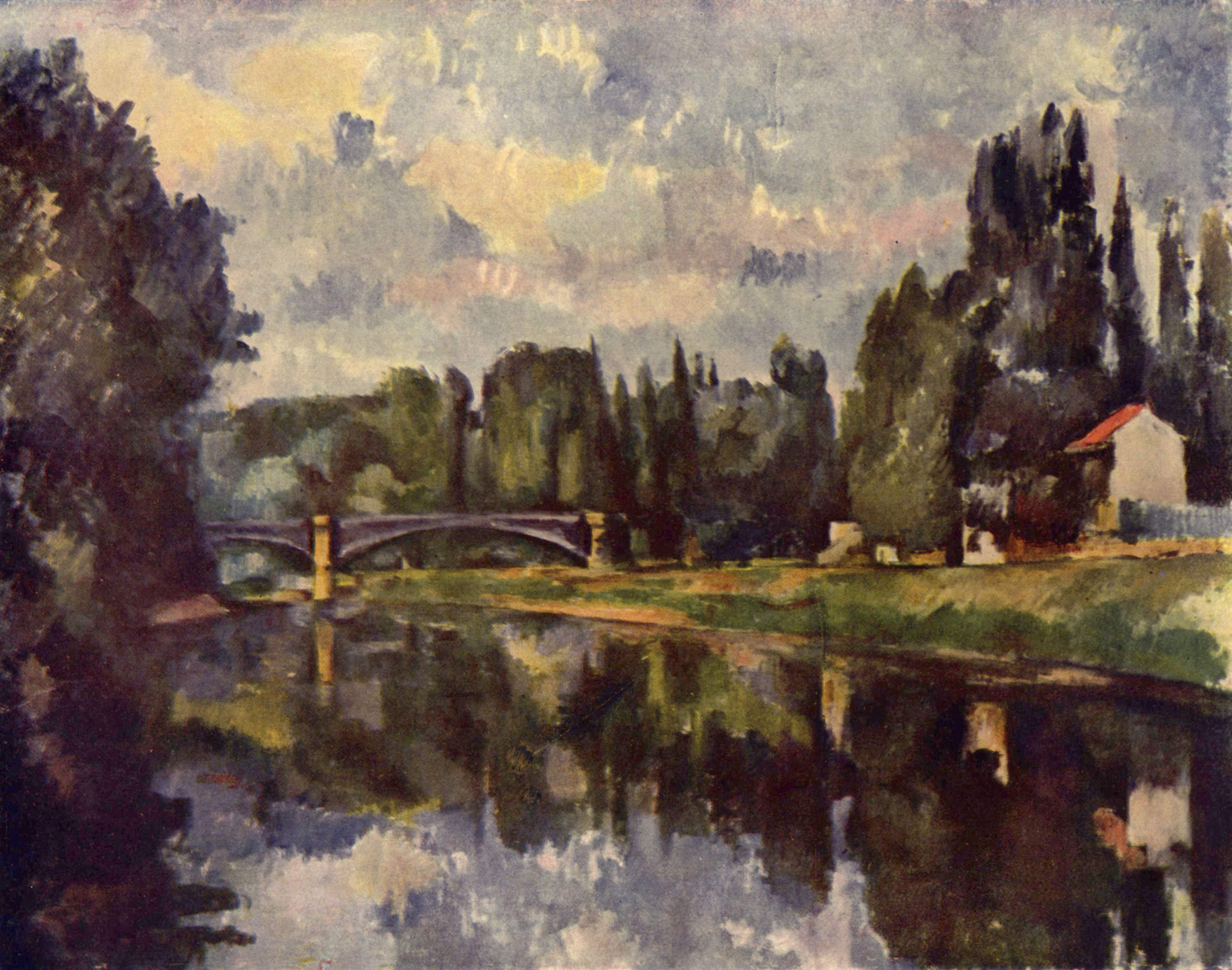
- Artist: Paul Cézanne
- Year: 1888
- Medium: oil on canvas
- Dimensions: 71 cm × 90 cm (28 in × 35 in)
- Location: Pushkin Museum, Moscow

The Banks of the Marne is an oil on canvas painting by the French artist Paul Cézanne, from 1888. It represents the bridge at Créteil on the River Marne. It is held in the Pushkin Museum, in Moscow.

== History and description ==
The painting depicts a river crossed by a two-span steel bridge. The riverbanks are covered with trees, and on the opposite bank stands a large, fenced-in house with a red roof.

According to Ambroise Vollard, cited by Henri Perruchot, the work was exhibited at the "exposition Cézanne" which the Galerie Vollard organised in November–December 1895. It formed part of the Pellerin collection before being sold to Vollard in 1912, who re-sold it later the same year to Ivan Morozov. Morozov's collection was seized by the state by a decree of Lenin in spring 1918 and moved to the Museum of Modern Western Art in autumn 1918. It entered its presented home in 1948 when the former Morozov and Shchukin collections were split between the Hermitage Museum and the Pushkin Museum.

== See also ==
- List of paintings by Paul Cézanne

== Bibliography (in French) ==
- Bernard Dorival, Cézanne, Paris, éd. Tisné, coll. Prométhée, 1948, p. 137, illustr. 160
- Joachim Gasquet, Cézanne, Paris, Bernheim jeune, 1921; réédition Paris, Encre Marine, 2002.
- Michel Hoog, Cézanne, « puissant et solitaire », Paris, Gallimard, coll. « Découvertes Gallimard / Arts » (no. 55), 2011.
- Lionello Venturi, Cézanne, son art, son œuvre, Paris, Rosenberg, 1936.
- Ambroise Vollard, Cézanne, Paris, Vollard, 1914.
- Ambroise Vollard, En écoutant Cézanne, Degas, Renoir, Paris, Grasset, 1938; réédition, Paris, Grasset, 1994.
