= Théophile Peyron =

French doctor

Doctor Théophile Peyron was a French naval doctor, who ran the mental hospital of Saint-Paul-de Mausole in a former monastery just outside Saint Rémy de Provence. Vincent van Gogh was one of his patients.
