= Marie Andrieu =

- Born: 13 July 1851; Saint-Rémy-de-Provence
- Died: 2 September 1911 (aged 60); Évenos
- Other names: Marie de Saint-Rémy, Romanoff, the Seer
- Occupations: cartomancer, spiritualist, anarchist, editor
- Known for: Multiple anarchist press publications
- Movement: Anarchism

Marie Andrieu (13 July 1851 – 2 September 1911), also known as Marie de Saint-Rémy, Romanoff, or the Seer, was a French spiritualist, cartomancer, editor of newspapers, and anarchist. She is best known for her work as an anarchist editor, founding nearly a dozen newspapers, the most famous of which was titled Le Christ Anarchiste ('The Anarchist Christ').

Born in Saint-Rémy-de-Provence, Andrieu married and had several children while simultaneously beginning to establish press outlets and practicing as a cartomancer. Following her husband's death in 1890, she found herself supporting four children and joined the anarchist movement around that time. Over the following decade, she distinguished herself by founding seven press publications; her most renowned title, Le Christ anarchiste, was published over a period of two years.

Andrieu was arrested on numerous occasions, both for her statements supporting propaganda of the deed and anarchist actions, and for the illegal practice of medicine, as the sale of her remedies served as her primary source of income.

Her unique synthesis of spiritualism, religion, and anarchism earned her criticism from certain anarchists—such as those associated with the journal Les Temps nouveaux. Conversely, others like Jacques Gross maintained that, outside her involvement with spiritualism, she was a reliable and highly intelligent anarchist.

Andrieu died in Évenos on 2 September 1911 at the age of 60.

== Biography ==
Marie Andrieu was born on 13 July 1851 in Saint-Rémy-de-Provence. She married a boilermaker, Claude Marius Teissier, with whom she had four children. In 1872, she was convicted of fraud. In 1885, she founded her first newspaper, titled Le journal d'Outre-tombe ('The Journal from Beyond the Grave'). Five years later, her husband died, leaving her as the sole provider for her four children.

In the early 1890s, while practicing as a "somnambulist cartomancer" in Marseille under the name Marie de Saint-Rémy, she became a subscriber to the newspaper Le Parti Ouvrier ('The Workers' Party'). The publication was run by the laborer Joseph Babinger, with whom she began a relationship in 1893. During this same period, Andrieu began hosting various anarchist companions in her home.

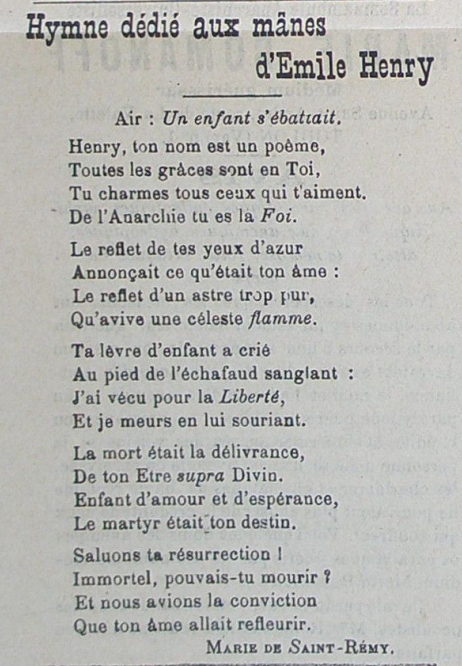
Poem by Marie de Saint-Rémy to Émile Henry in Le Christ anarchiste (N°05)

Living in Toulon at the time and supporting her family through the sale of medicinal remedies, the anarchist began a series of press publications in 1893. She started with Le Gambetta and Le Jugement dernier ('The Last Judgment') before founding her most famous work, Le Christ Anarchiste ('The Anarchist Christ'). In this publication, where her daughter Emma Teissier also significantly collaborated, Andrieu featured contributions from living anarchists while also invoking deceased figures such as Émile Henry, Isaac Newton, Jesus, and Charlotte Corday. This newspaper and Andrieu herself were criticized by Jean Grave’s Les Temps Nouveaux, which wrote that it was written "under the inspiration of a lady who tells fortunes to fools".

During the Ère des attentats (1892–1894), the anarchist was arrested and sentenced to one month in prison for threatening the station master of Saint-Charles station; she had threatened to blow up the building after he refused to extend her son's ticket. The following year, in April 1894, while passing through Apt, Marie de Saint-Rémy was noticed by the French authorities for making anarchist remarks and allegedly approving of recent anarchist bombings. During the summer of 1894, her home was raided twice by police, though nothing was found.

In February 1896, she faced two legal proceedings in quick succession: first, she was convicted for the illegal practice of medicine, and second, for inciting murder, theft, and looting—Andrieu was released the following month. During this period, she wrote an article allegedly dictated by the spirit of Auguste Vaillant. In September of the same year, the anarchist was arrested and imprisoned once again for the illegal practice of medicine, from where she sent poems and communications to the press. Although Le Christ Anarchiste was still active, she also published a journal titled L'Antéchrist ('The Antichrist') during this time, though it only lasted for a few issues.

At the beginning of the following year, she was arrested and incarcerated for an article in Le Christ Anarchiste threatening European kings if they did not grant clemency to the anarchists sentenced to death at Montjuïc in Barcelona. Upon her release, Marie de Saint-Rémy settled in Sainte-Anne d'Évenos with her partner.

In 1900, after another conviction for the illegal practice of medicine, the Reims police noted that she left the city "accompanied by her son, her daughter, and the anarchist Alfred Grandidier". Back in Toulon, she published a new journal, La Révolution, for about ten issues in 1901, followed by Le Sauveur des malades (The Savior of the Sick) in 1904. In 1902, she traveled to Ferney-Voltaire, where she reportedly conversed daily with the spirit of Voltaire.

In 1907, Andrieu was once again convicted for the illegal practice of medicine. She died in Évenos on 2 September 1911 at the age of 60.

== Legacy ==
=== Anarchist circles and thought ===
Andrieu was simultaneously criticized by Les Temps nouveaux and praised by other anarchists. For instance, Jacques Gross stated the following about her in a letter to the historian of the anarchist movement, Max Nettlau:

She is a brave woman with an excellent heart, intelligent in all matters, but when one brings up the subject of spirits, she becomes incoherent and inexhaustible.

Historian Marie-Pier Tardif observes that, unlike Louise Michel, who always presented a vision of pure anarchism, Marie de Saint-Rémy intertwined it with various religious beliefs, such as Christianity.

== Works ==
=== Books ===
- Les Dieux des anarchistes ('The Gods of Anarchists'), Librairie du magnétisme, 1899

=== Press ===
Collection of the site-archive Archives Anarchistes uploaded to Commons and comprising:

- 9 issues of Le Christ anarchiste

== Bibliography ==
- Dupuy, Rolf (2025), "SAINT REMY, Marie de [ANDRIEU, épouse TEISSIER] "ROMANOFF"; "La VOYANTE"", Dictionnaire international des militants anarchistes, Paris
- Maitron, Jean; Dupuy, Rolf; Morel Fontanelli, Françoise (2024), "ANDRIEUX Marie, épouse TEISSIER [ou Andrieu ; dite DE SAINT-REMY Marie, dite Romanoff]", Dictionnaire des anarchistes (Le Maitron), Paris: Le Maitron des anarchistes
- Horta, Gerard (2024), Marie Andrieu, una salvatge occitana [Marie Andrieu, an Occitan savage] (in Catalan), vol. 11, Tarragona: Lo Diable Gros Edicions, p. 240, ISBN 9788412564587
- Tardif, Marie-Pier (2021), Ni ménagères, ni courtisanes. Les femmes de lettres dans la presse anarchiste française (1885-1905) (PhD thesis) [Neither housewives nor courtesans. Women writers in the French anarchist press (1885-1905)] (PDF)
