= View of the Asylum and Chapel of Saint-Rémy =

1889 painting by Vincent van Gogh

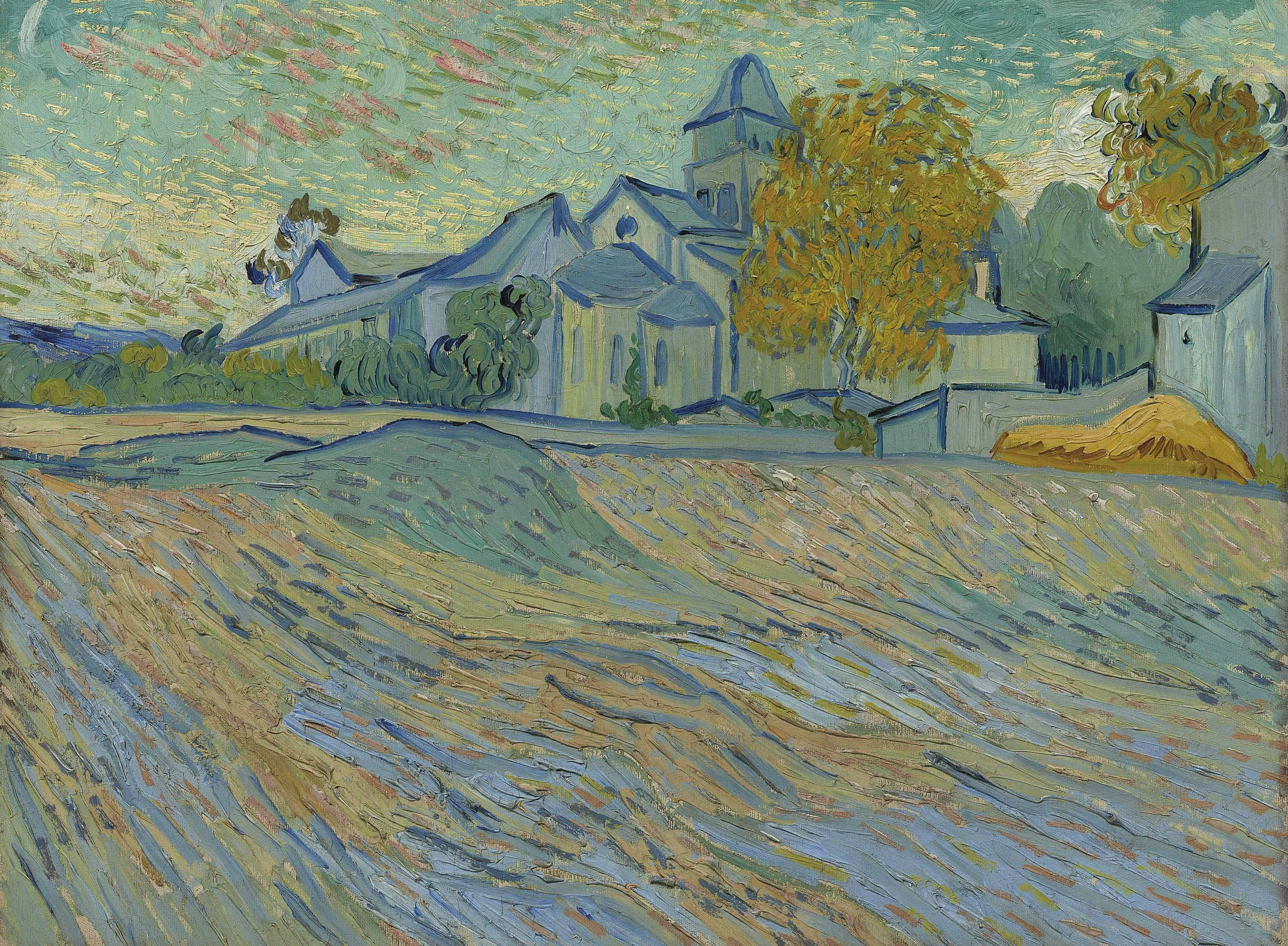
- Artist: Vincent van Gogh
- Year: 1889
- Catalogue: F803; JH2124
- Medium: Oil on canvas
- Dimensions: 45.1 cm × 60.4 cm (17.8 in × 23.8 in)
- Location: Private collection

View of the Asylum and Chapel of Saint-Rémy is an oil on canvas painting by Vincent van Gogh that he painted in autumn 1889 at Saint-Rémy, France, where he had voluntarily incarcerated himself in a lunatic asylum.

The painting was originally thought to be a view of the church at Labbeville, near Auvers, where he moved following his stay at the asylum, but it is now accepted to be a view of the asylum and church at Saint-Rémy. It may have been among the 'autumn studies' mentioned in Vincent's letter to his brother Theo of 7 December 1889.

According to Ronald Pickvance, "the view is unique in van Gogh's entire Saint-Remy oeuvre. It is the only work that affords a glimpse of the Romanesque tower of the original Augustinian monastery; in this respect, it can be compared with several views of the Romanesque tower of Saint-Trophime in Arles (e.g., F409, F515). Stylistically, it can be compared with Entrance to a Quarry.

The painting was in the collection of the actress Elizabeth Taylor, on display in her living room. In 2003 the heirs of German Jewish art collector Margarete Mauthner filed a claim against Taylor for Van Gogh's View of the Hospice and the Chapel of Saint-Remy. Elizabeth Taylor's father, Francis Lenn Taylor, an art dealer, had acquired it in 1963. The claim was dismissed and the painting was sold at auction in 2012 following her death for $15,991,575.

== See also ==
- List of works by Vincent van Gogh

== Bibliography ==
- de la Faille, Jacob-Baart. The Works of Vincent van Gogh: His Paintings and Drawings. Amsterdam: Meulenhoff, 1970. ISBN 978-1-55660-811-7
- Hulsker, Jan. The Complete Van Gogh. Oxford: Phaidon, 1980. ISBN 0-7148-2028-8
- Naifeh, Steven; Smith, Gregory White. Van Gogh: The Life. Profile Books, 2011. ISBN 978-1-84668-010-6
