= Joseph Déjacque =

French writer (1821–1864)

- Born: 27 December 1821; Paris, Kingdom of France
- Died: 18 November 1865 (aged 43); Gentilly, French Empire
- Occupations: House painter, journalist, poet
- Years active: 1848–1861
- Era: Long nineteenth century
- Notable work: Le Libertaire
- Movement: Anarchist communism, libertarianism

Joseph Déjacque (French: [deʒak]; 27 December 1821 – 18 November 1865) was a French political journalist and poet. A house painter by trade, during the 1840s, he became involved in the French labour movement and taught himself how to write poetry. He was an active participant in the French Revolution of 1848, fighting on the barricades during the June Days uprising, for which he was arrested and imprisoned. He quickly became a target for political repression by Louis Napoleon Bonaparte's government, which imprisoned him for his poetry and forced him to flee into exile. His experiences radicalised him towards anarchism and he regularly criticised republican politicians for their anti-worker sentiment.

After spending time in London and Jersey, he immigrated to the United States, developing a reputation as a controversial firebrand in New York City. There he became active in organising radical émigrés, helping to establish the International Association in 1855. He then moved to New Orleans, where he agitated for the abolition of slavery through social revolution, while also publishing essays that criticised Bonapartist figures and defended gender equality. Unable to find a publisher due to his abolitionist remarks, he returned to New York. There he established Le Libertaire, the first non-English-language anarchist newspaper in the United States, in which he printed his utopian fiction novel L'humanisphère. After Bonaparte's government extended an amnesty to exiled radicals, he returned to France, where he died in obscurity in the mid-1860s.

Today he is remembered as an early forerunner of anarchist communism and particularly for coining the political definition of the word "libertarian" (French: libertaire).

== Biography ==
Joseph Déjacque was born in Paris, on 27 December 1821. His father died while he was an infant and his mother worked as a washerwoman, paying for him to go to school in Faubourg Saint-Antoine, where he witnessed the July Revolution of 1830. In 1834, he left school to work as a paper hanger, going on to sell wallpaper on Boulevard des Capucines. He found the work boring and decided to join the French Navy in 1841, but was quickly put off by military discipline and the hierarchy of life at sea. He returned to selling wallpaper in Paris and by 1847 was self-employed as a house painter. At this time, he became involved with the radical workers' group that published the Christian socialist publication L'Atelier. During this time, Déjacque taught himself how to write what he called "social poetry".

=== Revolutionary activities (1848–1851) ===
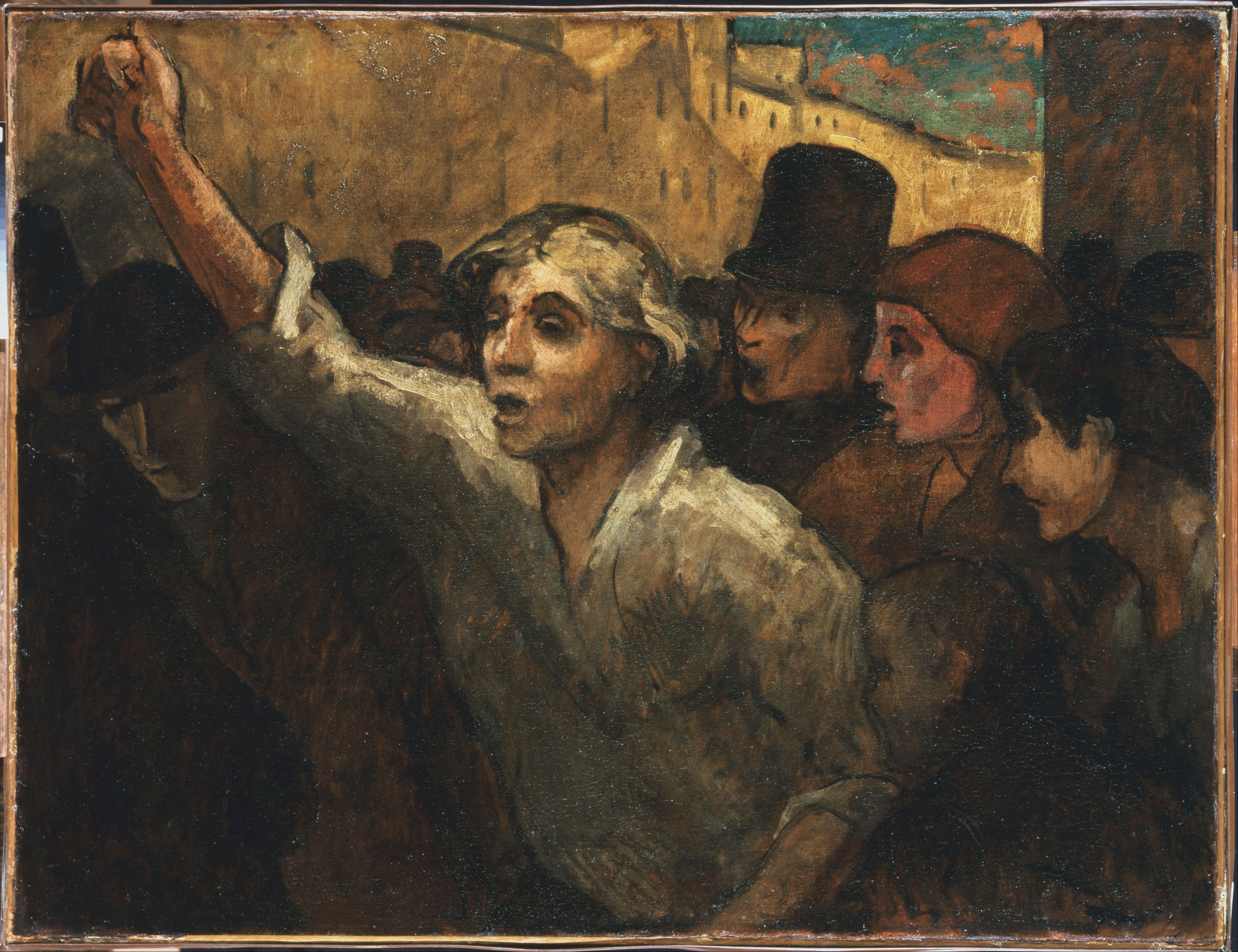
Jeanne Deroin, depicted as leading the French Revolution of 1848, in The Uprising (L'Emeute) by Honoré Daumier

Together with Ernest Cœurderoy, Déjacque was an active participant in the French Revolution of 1848, which deposed the July Monarchy and established the French Second Republic. Following the revolution, Déjacque joined the socialist feminist circles of Jeanne Deroin and Pauline Roland, becoming a keen supporter of women's rights and beginning his career as a revolutionary journalist.

Despite the regime change brought by the revolution, unemployment and poverty was still rife, forcing the newly-established provisional government to make concessions to Louis Blanc's socialist faction. The provisional government established National Workshops to employ Parisian workers, with Déjacque himself enrolling in the programme on 10 May. But within the month, the subsequent government of the Executive Commission shut down the Workshops and arrested a number of socialist leaders, which brought thousands of workers out into the streets in what became the June Days uprising. Déjacque fought on the barricades against the government, but the uprising was violently suppressed by the French Army and Déjacque was among the thousands that were arrested. Over 15,000 workers were deported, Déjacque himself was imprisoned at Cherbourg.

When Louis Napoleon Bonaparte was elected as President of France in December 1848, his government suppressed freedom of association and banned the remaining socialist clubs. Déjacque was released from prison in March 1849, but he continued to find himself in trouble with the authorities. Following the election of a conservative government in June 1849, he and Cœurderoy joined The Mountain's uprising against the administration. When this too was suppressed, Cœurderoy fled to Switzerland. Déjacque sought to justify the June events through his poetry, penning a collection of romantic poetry that depicted issues of class conflict, social injustice and the authoritarianism of religious and political institutions. This collection was published in August 1851 as Les Lazaréenes, Fables et Poesies Sociales (English: The Lazarenes, Fables and Social Poetry); by October 1851, Déjacque found himself charged with incitement over the anti-authoritarian themes he had expressed in the book, for which he was sentenced to two years in prison.

=== Exile and radicalisation (1851–1854) ===
During the "reactionary period" of the Second French Empire (1851–1871), the socialist press was suppressed, but French anarchist thought continued to develop abroad. Together with Anselme Bellegarrigue, Claude Pelletier and Ernest Cœurderoy, Déjacque became one of the period's most prominent French anarchist voices, helping to popularise the works of the anarchist thinker Pierre-Joseph Proudhon.

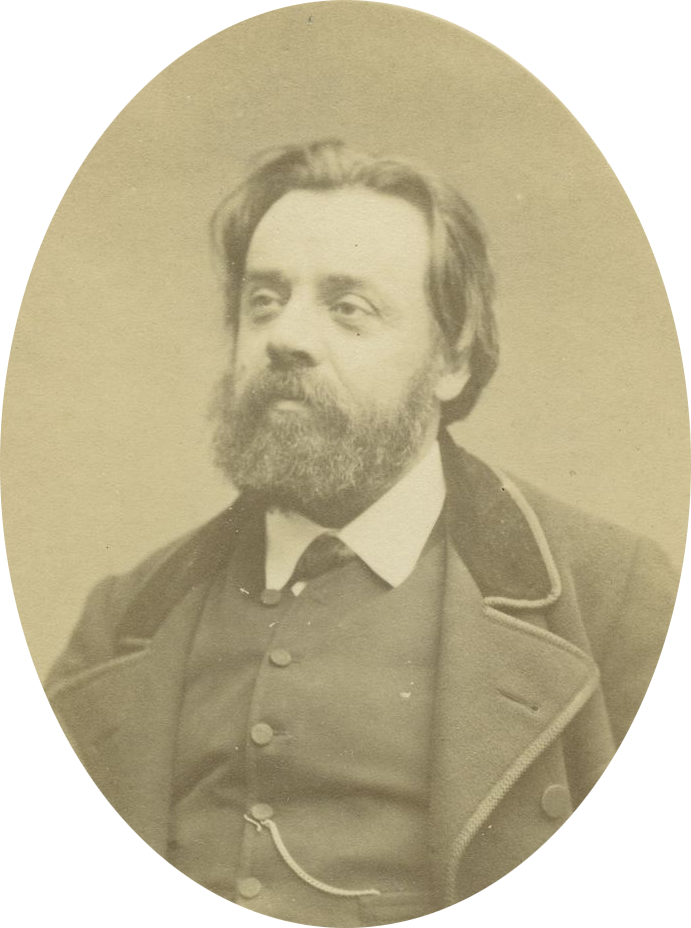
Gustave Lefrançais, a French anarchist with whom Déjacque lived during their exile in London

By the time of the 1851 French coup d'état, Déjacque had fled into exile, making his way to Brussels and then on to London. Upon arrival in the British capital, he was reunited with fellow French anarchist Gustave Lefrançais, who informed him of the situation of their exiled compatriots. Déjacque complained to Lefrançais about the moral disengagement of the republican exiles led by Alexandre Auguste Ledru-Rollin and the cult of personality around factional leaders such as Louis Auguste Blanqui, finding himself disillusioned by the complete lack of rapport between the rival émigré factions.

At the funeral of an exiled French worker, when republican leaders turned to leave prematurely, Déjacque forced himself to the front, demanding to speak and be heard. He fiercely criticised the "bourgeois republicans" and declared himself an enemy of "all who, in London and Paris, dream of governing to better guarantee their social privileges against proletarian demands, one in the name of Empire, the other in the name of the Republic." Some of the exiled French workers, including Déjacque and Lefrançais, found themselves living in poverty in Soho, subsisting only on meagre rations. They were sent relief funds by sympathetic workers in France, but the distribution of this money was controlled by the exiled political leaders, with their mutual aid societies sitting on much of the money that they collected.

By 1853, Déjacque had moved to the Channel island of Jersey. There he started to vocally advocate for violence against the state and began penning an essay, "The Revolutionary Question", inspired by the example of Armand Barbès. He also attended the funeral of the French revolutionary poet Louise Julien, where he protested the appointment of Victor Hugo as the "sole speaker" at the burial. Such continued radical outbursts ended up isolating Déjacque from the rest of the French exiles, spurring him to move to the United States the following year.

=== Émigré organising in New York (1854–1855) ===
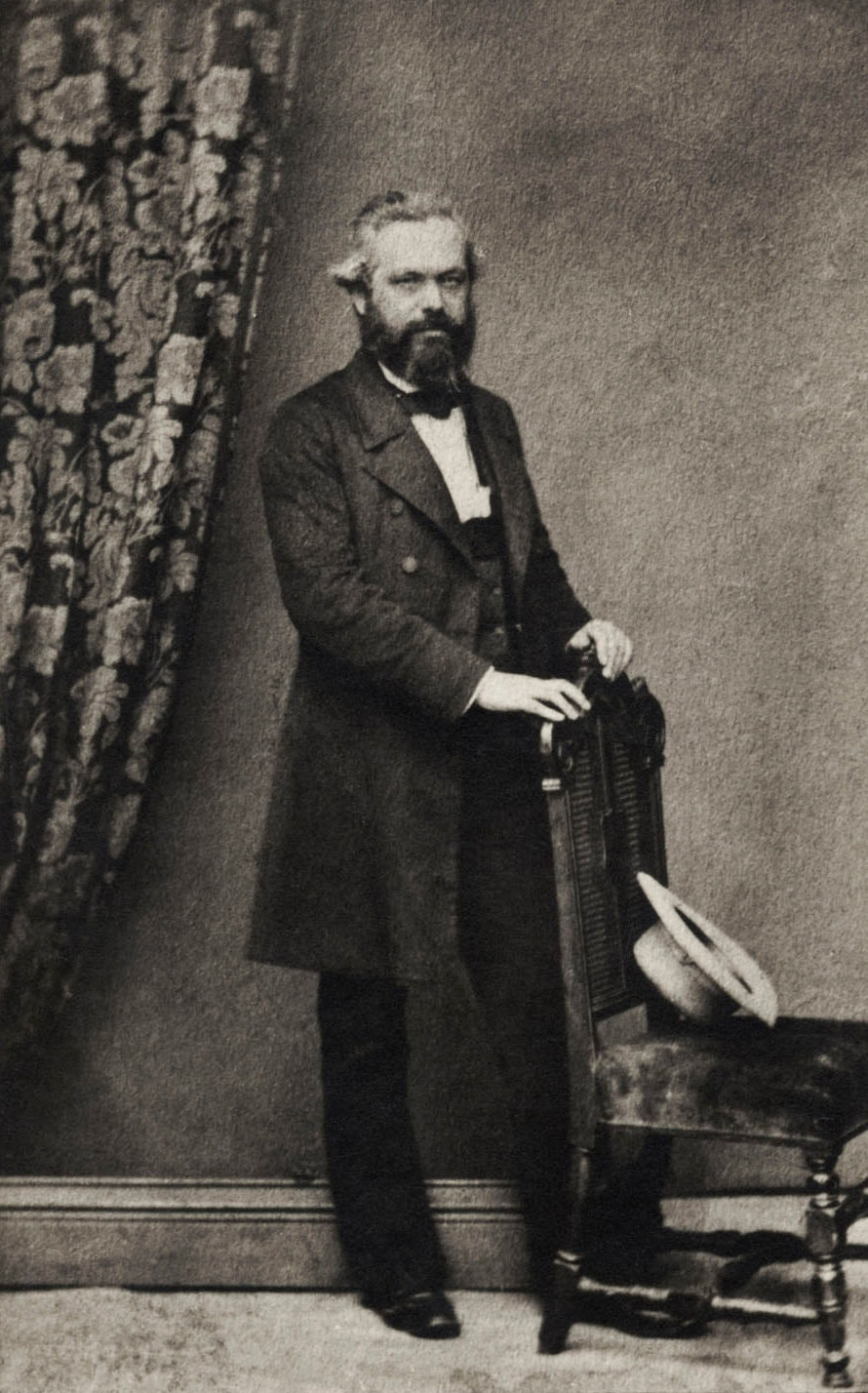
Karl Marx, whose German communist followers would make up the largest part of Déjacque's International Association

Upon arrival in New York City, Déjacque returned to work painting houses and became involved with the French radical emigres in the city. Having earned fame for his romantic poetry, in June 1854, he was invited to speak at a republican society, where he presented his essay, "The Revolutionary Question", for the first time. In his speech, he called for a "war on civilization by criminal means", advocating for small revolutionary cells to carry out direct action against traditional institutions, such as the Church, state, private property and even the family. Although it was largely poorly received by its audience, he gained enough support to publish the essay the following month.

Having recognised the international character of the Revolutions of 1848 and that the counterrevolutionary repression had brought together revolutionaries of different nationalities, Déjacque began to advocate for workers to set aside bourgeois nationalism and instead practice proletarian internationalism. In February 1855, Déjacque participated in the establishment of the International Association (IA), which was formed by a coalition of British Chartists, German communists, American radicals and French socialists. Despite the international character of the organisation, Déjacque mostly kept to the French community; there is no evidence that he ever spoke English during his time in the United States. By 1858, the IA had dissolved due to internal differences over revolutionary nationalism.

=== Activism in New Orleans (1855–1858) ===
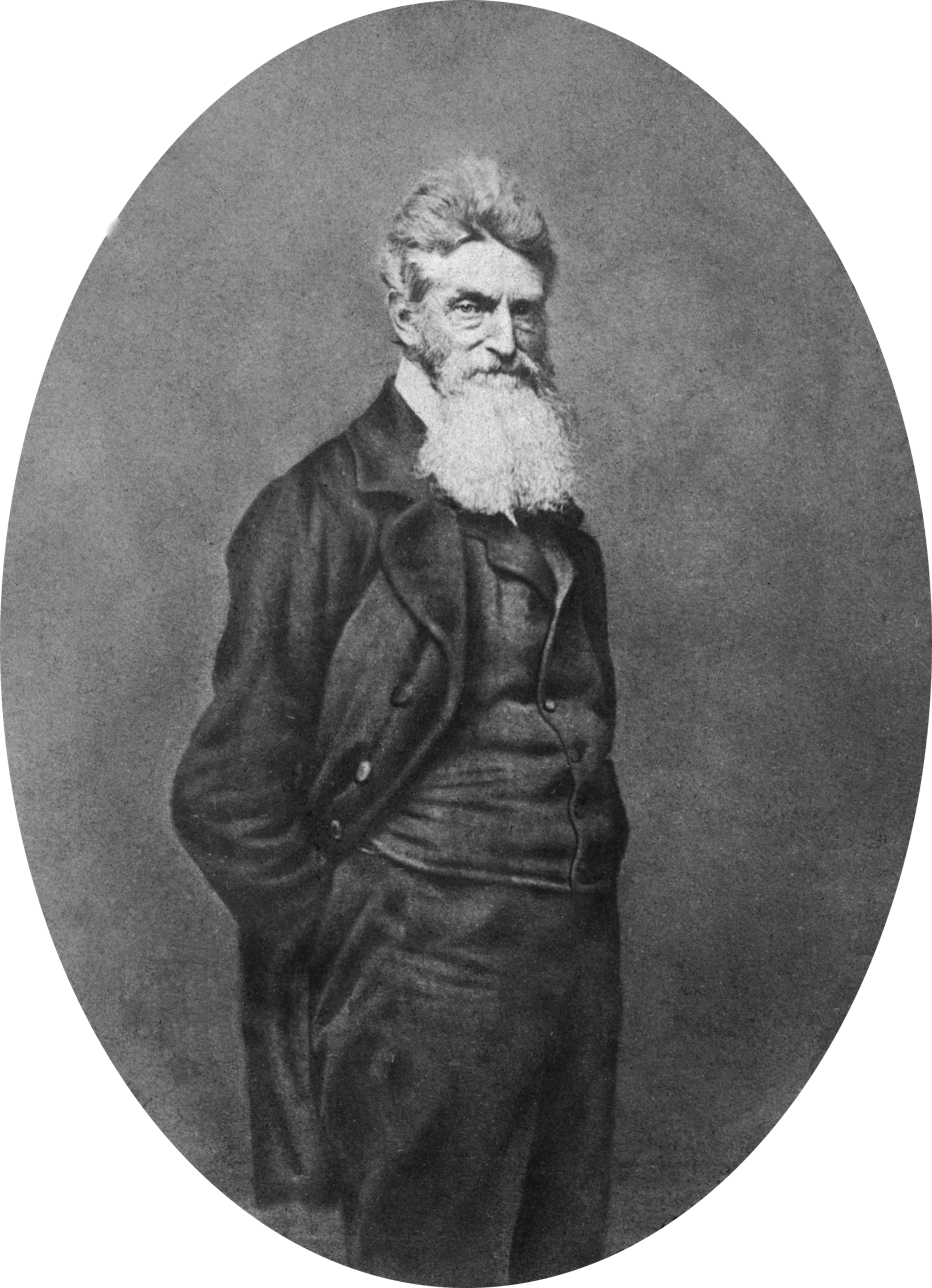
John Brown, a radical abolitionist whom Déjacque praised during his time in New Orleans

Not long after the founding of the International Association, Déjacque moved to New Orleans, a relatively cosmopolitan southern city where French radicalism had taken already root, although its followers chose to defer the pressing question of abolition. While his fellow émigrés respected these boundaries of American republicanism, Déjacque himself made no pretence towards respectability. In 1856, he gave a public address at a bar in Royal Street, calling on slaves to arm themselves and rise up against the United States. He praised the actions of the radical abolitionist John Brown and advocated for a united front between the white working class and black slaves, which he believed could together overthrow the United States in a social revolution and bring about a post-racial America. He was not able to find a publisher for his abolitionist remarks.

He nevertheless continued to publish his radical writings, including a polemic against the Bonapartist Pierre-Jean de Béranger and an open letter on gender equality addressed to Pierre-Joseph Proudhon, the latter of which he included in an expanded second edition of Les Lazaréenes. In the open letter, he criticised Proudhon for his antifeminism, which he saw as inconsistent with anarchism; Déjacque declared that he refused to "establish hierarchic distinctions between the sexes and races," saying that to him "humanity is humanity". He also became the first person to use the term "libertarian" (French: libertaire) in a political sense, defining it synonymously with "anarchist".

He also attempted to publish a work of utopian fiction, but was not able to secure enough subscriptions to cover the cost of printing. By February 1858, the failure of Déjacque's publishing efforts left him disillusioned with New Orleans and he returned to New York.

=== Publishing in New York (1858–1861) ===
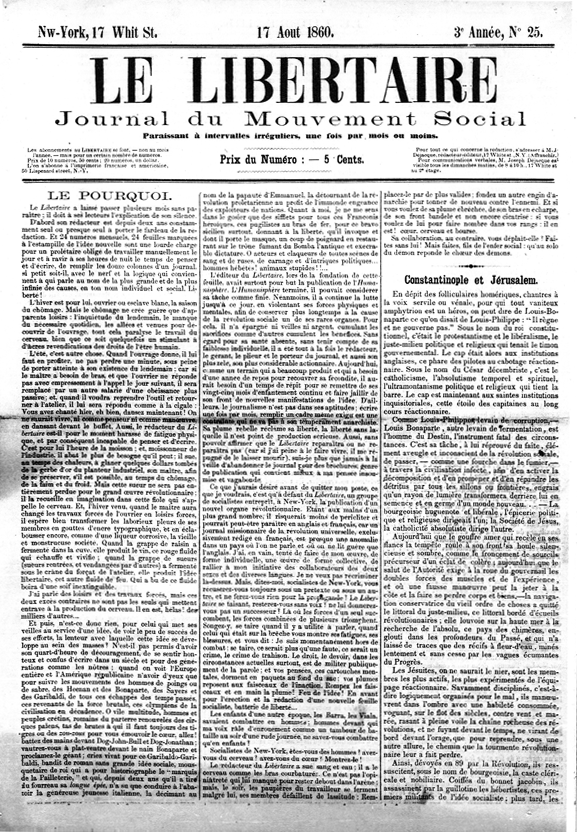
Front page of Le Libertaire, the newspaper established by Déjacque in New York

Upon his return, Déjacque found himself living in poverty; in order to fund his publishing efforts, he returned to work painting houses and solicited donations from sympathisers. In June 1858, he established the newspaper Le Libertaire, journal d'un mouvement social. Published on a shoestring budget and with Déjacque as its main contributor, the paper ran 27 issues between 1858 and 1861. With this, Déjacque became the first publisher of a non-English-language anarchist newspaper in the United States, although this limited its reach to French émigrés.

During this period, he finally published his utopian novel, L'humanisphère, which he serialised in Le Libertaire. Set in the year 2858, L'humanisphère depicted the kind of society that Déjacque hoped would eventually arise after the abolition of capitalism. Inspired by the work of Charles Fourier, Déjacque formulated a radical form of communism distinct from the authoritarian models advocated by many of his peers. His society had no government or religion; instead, sovereign individuals governed themselves and participated directly in all group decision-making.

In an attempt to go further than any previous works of utopian fiction, he depicted L'humanisphère as a world in which every individual was able to achieve their potential, as they lived in conditions of post-scarcity, without any form of poverty. In this future society, "commerce, [the] scourge of the 19th century," had been eliminated; nothing was being bought or sold. In order to achieve this, Déjacque proposed the abolition of all private property, exchange values and states, and their replacement with anarchy. He considered a worker's right to be the satisfaction of their needs, rather than the product of their own labour, as he felt the latter would inevitably lead to capital accumulation. He thus advocated for "unlimited freedom of production and consumption", subordinated only to the authority of the "statistics book". In order to guarantee the universal satisfaction of needs, Déjacque saw the need for the abolition of forced labour through workers' self-management, which he figured would replace "arduous work" with "attractive work".

Déjacque's imaginative writing in L'humanisphère has been described as a "series of anarchic dreams of marvelous textures and wondrous designs", going beyond rationality and constructing an entirely alternate reality. It has been cited as a literary form of Neo-Impressionism, with art historian Robyn Roslack highlighting the following passage: "Just as orbs [atoms and molecules] circulate anarchically in universality, so men must circulate anarchically in humanity, under the sole impulse of sympathies and aversions, of reciprocal attractions and repulsions. Harmony can only exist through anarchy. There is the whole solution to the social problem." Although it anticipated the utopian society depicted by H. G. Wells in Men Like Gods, L'humanisphère is often overlooked in studies of utopian fiction, which neglect it in favour of focusing on more well-known examples, like Plato's Republic, Thomas More's Utopia and Étienne Cabet's The Voyage to Icaria.

=== Final years (1861–1865) ===
With the outbreak of the Franco-Austrian War in 1859, Louis Napoleon Bonaparte moved to mend ties with the previously repressed French secularists and offered amnesty to all exiled radicals. Shortly before the outbreak of the American Civil War, in February 1861, Le Libertaire ran its final issue and Déjacque finally returned to Paris.

Déjacque lived out his final years in obscurity, which has led to differing accounts over the cause and time of his death. According to Gustave Lefrançais, Déjacque died in 1864, reportedly having succumbed to mental illness. According to hospital records, he was admitted to Bicêtre Hospital on 22 April 1864 and died from paralysis on 18 November 1865. Other sources allege that he committed suicide in 1867, or died much later of natural causes after experiencing a religious conversion.

== Legacy ==
=== Anarchist communism ===
Around the time that Déjacque died, in 1864, the socialist movement experienced a revival with the foundation of the International Workingmen's Association (IWA), established by a coalition of British Chartists and French mutualists. As time went on, anarchists in the International increasingly gravitated away from Proudhon's mutualism and towards the anarchist communism favoured by Déjacque. Parts of his programme were implemented during the Paris Commune in 1871.

Déjacque's advocacy of violence also anticipated later insurrectionary anarchists' conception of "propaganda of the deed", as well as the nihilism of Sergey Nechayev. Embarrassed by this violent temperament, when Jean Grave re-published L'humanisphère in 1899, he cut out parts that could have been read as incitement. Nevertheless, this reprint exposed Déjacque's conception of communism to a new generation. Déjacque's "iconoclastic" anarchist communism, with both its utopian and insurrectionary dimensions, was soon taken up by Peter Kropotkin and Luigi Galleani. By the turn of the 20th century, anarchist historians Max Nettlau and Gustav Landauer were beginning to characterise Déjacque as a "vital forerunner" of anarchist communism.

=== Libertarianism ===
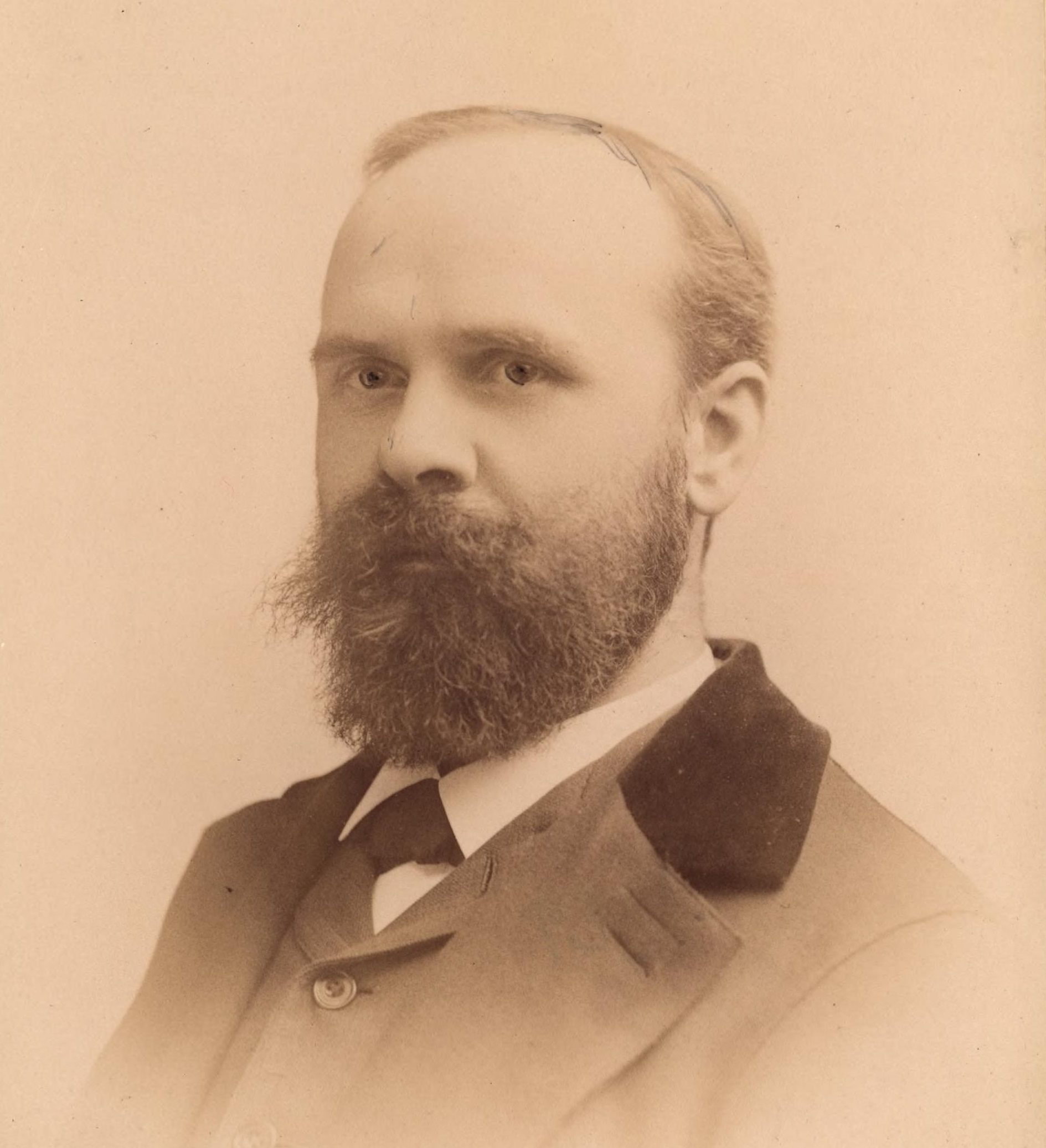
Benjamin Tucker, one of the first people to adopt the term "libertarian" from Déjacque

Before Déjacque, "libertarianism" had referred to a metaphysical philosophy that upheld the notion of free will. Over time, Déjacque's libertarianism was developed into a political philosophy that upholds liberty. It was first adopted in the 1880s by American individualist anarchists such as Benjamin Tucker; and then in the 1890s by French anarchists such as Sébastien Faure, in order to distinguish anarchism from authoritarian socialism.

During the 20th century, figures of the New Left began to refer to themselves as "libertarian socialists"; with anarchists such as Daniel Guérin using the term to avoid the negative connotations of "anarchism", while Marxists such as E. P. Thompson used it to distance themselves from Marxism-Leninism. By this time, the term also gained popularity among proponents of laissez-faire and free market economics, such as Robert Nozick, David Friedman and Murray Rothbard. This re-definition of libertarianism is largely used in the English-speaking world; in the contemporary French language, this latter form is today referred to by the word "libertarien", while the term "libertaire" has retained its left-wing anarchist definition.

Over one hundred years after his death, Déjacque's work has been slowly rediscovered, with the protests of 1968 and later dissolution of the Soviet Union spurring fresh interest in his vision of libertarian socialism. His works have recently developed an "underground reputation", due in part to the English language translations carried out by Shawn Wilbur.

== Selected works ==
Essays

- Déjacque, Joseph (2 July 1854). "The Revolutionary Question". Le Républicain. Translated by Wilbur, Shawn P. – via Libertarian Labyrinth.
- ————————— (May 1857). "On the Human Being, Male and Female". Les Temps nouveaux. Translated by Mayo Crane, Jonathan – via Libertarian Labyrinth.
- ————————— (2 August 1858). "Scandal". Le Libertaire. No. 4. Translated by Wilbur, Shawn P. – via Libertarian Labyrinth.
- ————————— (21 September 1858). "On Exchange". Le Libertaire. No. 6. Translated by Wilbur, Shawn P. – via Libertarian Labyrinth.
- ————————— (7 April 1859). "Down with the Bosses!". Le Libertaire. No. 12. Translated by Wilbur, Shawn P. – via Libertarian Labyrinth.
- ————————— (26 October 1859). "The Servile War". Le Libertaire. No. 18. Translated by Wilbur, Shawn P. – via Libertarian Labyrinth.

Novels

- ————————— (1859). The Humanisphere: Anarchic Utopia. Translated by Wilbur, Shawn P. Le Libertaire – via Libertarian Labyrinth.

Poetry

- ————————— (1851). Les Lazaréenes, fables et poésies sociales (in French). Paris: Chez l’Auteur.

== Bibliography ==
- Antliff, Allan (2017). "Anarchism and Aesthetics". In Jun, Nathan (ed.). Brill's Companion to Anarchism and Philosophy. Leiden: Brill. pp. 39–50. doi:10.1163/9789004356894_003. ISBN 978-90-04-35689-4.
- Gordon, Uri (2017). "Anarchism and Nationalism". In Jun, Nathan (ed.). Brill's Companion to Anarchism and Philosophy. Leiden: Brill. pp. 196–215. doi:10.1163/9789004356894_009. ISBN 978-90-04-35689-4.
- Graham, Robert, ed. (2005). "Revolutionary Ideas And Action". Anarchism: A Documentary History of Libertarian Ideas. Vol. 1. Montreal: Black Rose Books. pp. 43–71. ISBN 1-55164-251-4.
- Graham, Robert (2019). "Anarchism and the First International". In Adams, Matthew S.; Levy, Carl (eds.). The Palgrave Handbook of Anarchism. London: Palgrave Macmillan. pp. 325–342. doi:10.1007/978-3-319-75620-2_19. ISBN 978-3319756196. S2CID 158605651.
- Hartman, Janine C.; Lause, Mark A. (2012). "Joseph Déjacque: Émigré Journalist". In the Sphere of Humanity: Joseph Déjacque, Slavery, and the Struggle for Freedom. University of Cincinnati. pp. 4–39.
- Kropotkin, Peter (1911). "Anarchism". In Chisholm, Hugh (ed.). Encyclopædia Britannica. Vol. 1 (11th ed.). Cambridge University Press. pp. 914–919.
- Long, Roderick T. (2017). "Anarchism and Libertarianism". In Jun, Nathan (ed.). Brill's Companion to Anarchism and Philosophy. Leiden: Brill. pp. 285–317. doi:10.1163/9789004356894_012. ISBN 978-90-04-35689-4.
- Maitron, Jean; Pichon, Karine; Veyron, Franck (2014). "DÉJACQUE Joseph". Dictionnaire des anarchistes (in French). Paris: Éditions de l'Atelier. OCLC 1158613719.
- Marshall, Peter H. (2008) [1992]. Demanding the Impossible: A History of Anarchism. London: Harper Perennial. ISBN 978-0-00-686245-1. OCLC 218212571.
- Pengam, Alain (1987). "Anarcho-Communism". In Ribel, Maximilien; Crump, John (eds.). Non-Market Socialism in the Nineteenth and Twentieth Centuries. Palgrave Macmillan. pp. 60–82. doi:10.1007/978-1-349-18775-1_4. ISBN 978-1-349-18775-1.
- Stone, Vincent, ed. (2014). "Joseph Déjacque (1821-1864)". Disruptive Elements: The Extremes of French Anarchism. Ardent Press. pp. 12–24. OCLC 908851863.
- Wilbur, Shawn P. (2019). "Mutualism". In Adams, Matthew S.; Levy, Carl (eds.). The Palgrave Handbook of Anarchism. London: Palgrave Macmillan. pp. 213–224. doi:10.1007/978-3-319-75620-2_11. ISBN 978-3319756196. S2CID 242074567.
- Woodcock, George (1962). "Anarchism in France". Anarchism: A History Of Libertarian Ideas And Movements. World Publishing Company. pp. 275–326. LCCN 62-12355.
