= Still Life with Peaches and Pears =

1888–1890 painting by Paul Cézanne

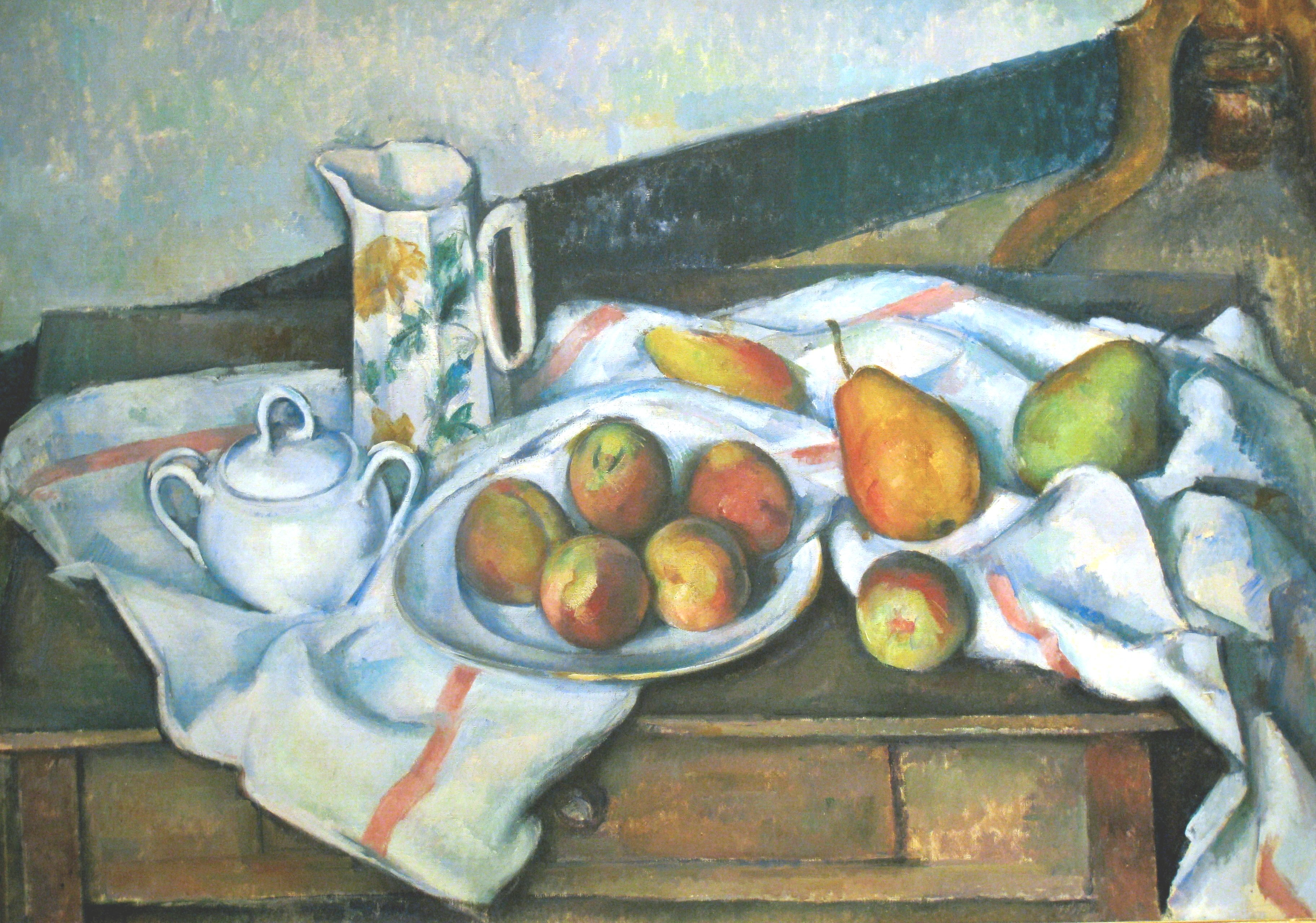
- Artist: Paul Cézanne
- Year: 1888-90
- Medium: oil on canvas
- Dimensions: 61 cm × 90 cm (24 in × 35 in)
- Location: Pushkin Museum, Moscow

Still Life with Peaches and Pears or Still Life with Sugar Bowl is an oil-on-canvas painting by the French artist Paul Cézanne, from 1888–1890. It is held at the Pushkin Museum, in Moscow It is similar to another still life by the artist which is now in the National Museum of Art, Architecture and Design, in Oslo.

It was bought from Ambroise Vollard in 1912 by Ivan Morozov, whose collections were seized by the Soviet state in the spring of 1918. It was then moved to the State Museum of Modern Western Art, remaining there until its closure in 1948, when it was moved to the Pushkin Museum, where it remains. It has appeared in temporary exhibitions in 1926 and 1955 in Moscow, in 1936 at the Musée de l'Orangerie in Paris, and in 1956 in Leningrad.

== See also ==
- List of paintings by Paul Cézanne

== Bibliography (in French) ==
- Georges Charensol, 'Les Détracteurs de Cézanne', in L'Art vivant, n° 37, 1926, p. 494, ill.
- Bernard Dorival, Cézanne, Paris, Tisné, 1948.
- Joachim Gasquet, Cézanne, Paris, Bernheim jeune, 1921; réédition Paris, Encre Marine, 2002.
- Michel Hoog, Cézanne, « puissant et solitaire », Paris, Gallimard, coll. « Découvertes Gallimard / Arts » (no. 55), 2011.
- Lionello Venturi, Cézanne, son art, son œuvre, Paris, Rosenberg, 1936.
- Ambroise Vollard, Cézanne, Paris, Vollard, 1914.
- Ambroise Vollard, En écoutant Cézanne, Degas, Renoir, Paris, Grasset, 1938; réédition, Paris, Grasset, 1994.
