= Le Christ Anarchiste =

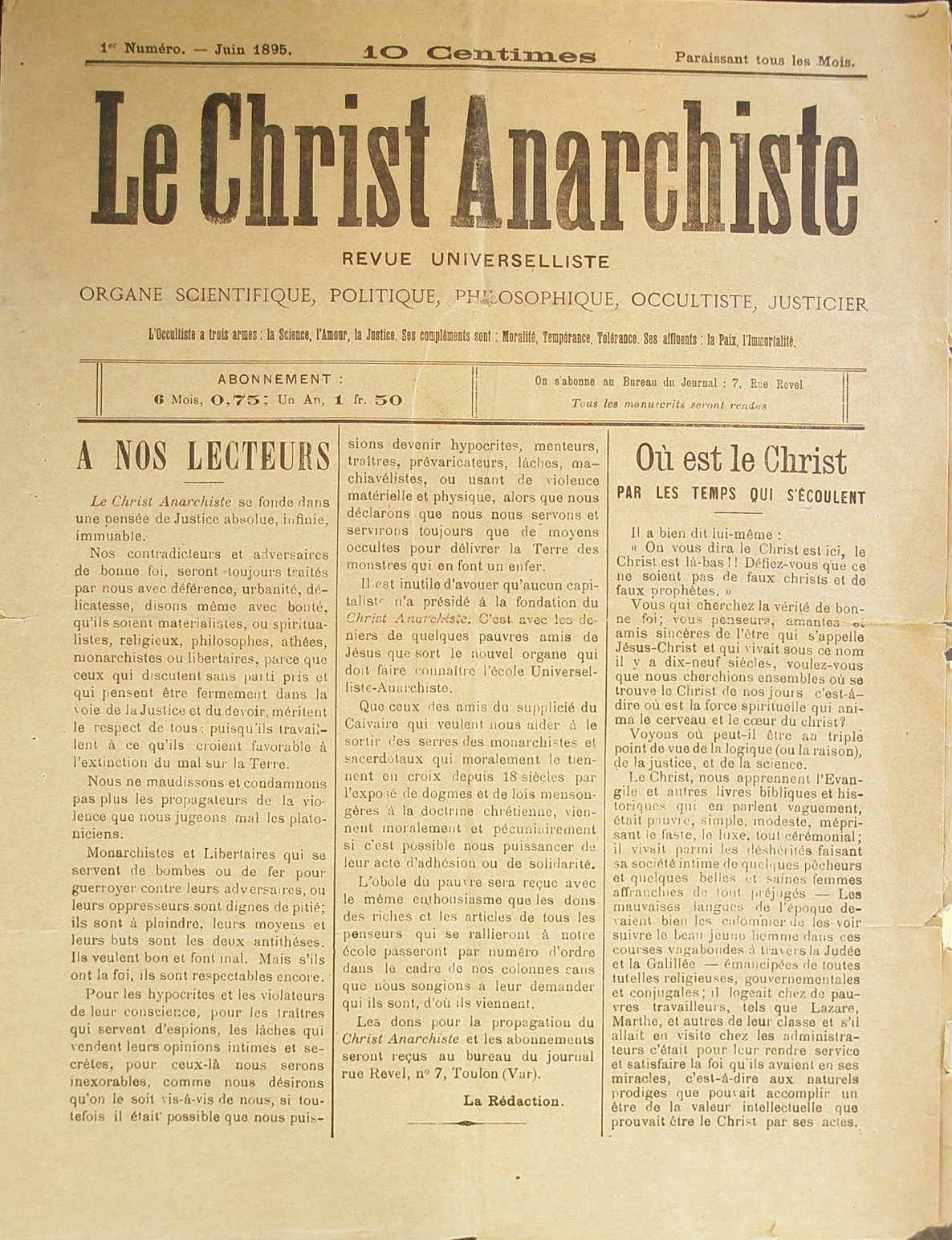
- First issue of the newspaper
- Founder(s): Marie Andrieu; Emma Teissier; Joseph Babinger
- Founded: June 1895
- Ceased publication: 15 January 1897
- Political alignment: Anarchism
- Language: French
- Headquarters: Toulon, France

Le Christ Anarchiste (English: The Anarchist Christ) was an anarchist newspaper published between June 1895 and January 1897 in Toulon, France. Published by Marie Andrieu, it was notable for its singular blend of anarchism and Christianity.

Andrieu, who worked as a cartomancer and joined the anarchist movement in the 1890s, established a series of relatively short-lived newspapers before launching this title. She wrote for the publication alongside her partner, Joseph Babinger, and her daughter, Emma Tessier, as well as a list of deceased personalities whom she claimed to channel and who supposedly transmitted their last wishes to her. These figures included, among others: Jesus, Émile Henry, Ravachol, Auguste Blanqui, Sadi Carnot, Auguste Vaillant, Charlotte Corday and Isaac Newton. The publication was criticized by Jean Grave’s Les Temps nouveaux, a major newspaper of the movement at the time, which dismissed it as being written 'under the inspiration of a lady who tells fortunes to fools'.

Following an article in which she threatened European monarchs, Andrieu was arrested, forcing the newspaper to cease publication. It is noted today as an indicator of the birth of Christian anarchism in France.

== History ==
=== Trajectory of Andrieu ===
Born in Saint-Rémy-de-Provence, Marie Andrieu married and had several children while working as a cartomancer. Following her husband's death in 1890, she was left to care for four children on her own.

In the early 1890s, she was a subscriber to the newspaper Le Parti Ouvrier ('The Workers' Party'), run by Joseph Babinger, with whom she began a relationship in 1893. During this same period, Andrieu began hosting various anarchist companions in her home and started publishing several newspapers.

=== Le Christ Anarchiste ===
Andrieu founded the newspaper and launched the first issue in June 1895. Initially, its title was 'Le Christ Anarchiste: Revue universelliste, organe scientifique, philosophique, occultiste, justicier' before becoming 'Le Christ Anarchiste: organe anarchiste' starting from the fifth issue. Two exceptions to this labeling exist, however: the title published for Good Friday 1896 was titled solely 'Le Christ Anarchiste', and the twelfth issue was titled 'Le Christ Anarchiste: le sauveur des malades'.

Babinger was the publication's manager at first, before it became Henri Albran. Two types of texts were published in the newspaper; on one hand, texts written by living people, including:

Marie Andrieu, Emma Teissier (her daughter), a certain 'Ariane', or Joseph Babinger.

On the other hand, many articles were published and attributed to deceased personalities, who allegedly intervened and transmitted their wills from the grave. Among these figures featured in the newspaper were:

Jesus, Émile Henry, Ravachol, Auguste Blanqui, Sadi Carnot, Auguste Vaillant, Charlotte Corday and Isaac Newton.

The publication stopped after its twelfth issue, at the beginning of 1897, when Andrieu was arrested and incarcerated for an article threatening European monarchs in the event that they did not obtain pardons for the anarchists sentenced to death at Montjuïc, in Barcelona. Once released, Marie de Saint-Rémy settled in Sainte-Anne-d'Évenos with her partner.

== Legacy ==
=== Anarchist circles ===
The publication was criticized by Jean Grave’s Les Temps nouveaux, which dismissed it as being written 'under the inspiration of a lady who tells fortunes to fools'.

=== Christian anarchism in France ===
Historian Marie-Pier Tardif highlights Andrieu's intellectual specificity among the female anarchist activists of this period; indeed, where figures like Louise Michel present an anarchism stripped of religious conceptions, Andrieu distinguishes herself, particularly in this newspaper, by the blend she creates between anarchism and the Christian religion.

== Works ==
=== Press ===
Collection of the site-archive Archives Anarchistes uploaded to Commons and comprising:

- 9 issues of Le Christ anarchiste

== Bibliography ==
- Maitron, Jean; Dupuy, Rolf; Morel Fontanelli, Françoise (2024), "ANDRIEUX Marie, épouse TEISSIER [ou Andrieu ; dite DE SAINT-REMY Marie, dite Romanoff]", Dictionnaire des anarchistes (Le Maitron), Paris: Le Maitron des anarchistes
- Dupuy, Rolf (2025), "SAINT REMY, Marie de [ANDRIEU, épouse TEISSIER] "ROMANOFF" ; "La VOYANTE"", Dictionnaire international des militants anarchistes, Paris
- Tardif, Marie-Pier (2021), Ni ménagères, ni courtisanes. Les femmes de lettres dans la presse anarchiste française (1885-1905) (PhD thesis) [Neither housewives nor courtesans. Women writers in the French anarchist press (1885-1905)] (PDF)
