= Marius Girard =

French poet

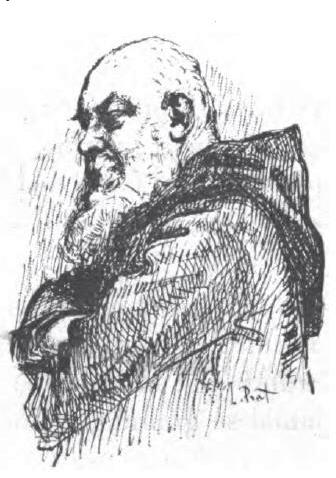
- Born: May 10, 1838; Saint-Rémy-de-Provence, Bouches-du-Rhône, Provence-Alpes-Côte d'Azur, France
- Died: August 1, 1906
- Occupation: Poet
- Children: Marie Gasquet
- Relatives: Joachim Gasquet (son-in-law) Arno Gasquet(great-grand-nephew]])

Marius Girard (1838–1906) was a French poet. He composed poetry in French and Provençal.
