= Louise Julien =

French poet and revolutionary (1815–1853)

- Born: Louise Anselme d'Ataïde; 17 June 1815; 12th arrondissement of Paris, France
- Died: 23 July 1853 (aged 38); Jersey
- Resting place: Macpela cemetery, Jersey
- Occupations: Poet, revolutionary

Louise Anselme d'Ataïde (1815–1853), commonly known by her pseudonym Louise Julien, was a French poet and revolutionary. Born into poverty, she participated in the French Revolution of 1848 and fled France after the rise of the Second French Empire. Her life may have been a source of inspiration for the character of Cosette in Victor Hugo's Les Misérables.

== Biography ==
Louise Julien was the illegitimate daughter of Céleste Éléonore Lévesque, a dressmaker, and Louis Antoine Manuel from a prominent Portuguese aristocratic family. To regularise the situation, Manuel married Lévesque in 1818, the age difference between the couple being 46 years. Louise Julien's father quickly had to return to Portugal because of the political situation, which left his daughters in need as his wife once again became a seamstress. Louise and her sister Héloïse had to look after their sick mother for 10 years. On 7 August 1834, Louise married Étienne Louis Astruc, a tailor. At this point in her life, she decided to take the name "Julien" rather than her father's or her husband's. She was known in working-class circles, with whom she identified herself, for her popular songs.

Julien took part in the Revolution of February 1848, when the people of Paris rose up and the French Second Republic was proclaimed. She also took part in the June Days, a revolt by Parisian workers in June 1848 to protest against the closure of the National Workshops, and resistance to the coup d'état of 2 December 1851. Injured, she was arrested on 21 January 1853 and contracted tuberculosis while in prison; after her release, she departed for Belgium, from which she was expelled. She finally arrived in London, where she met Jeanne Deroin, to whom she dedicated a poem.

Julien died in Jersey, on 23 July 1853.

== Legacy ==
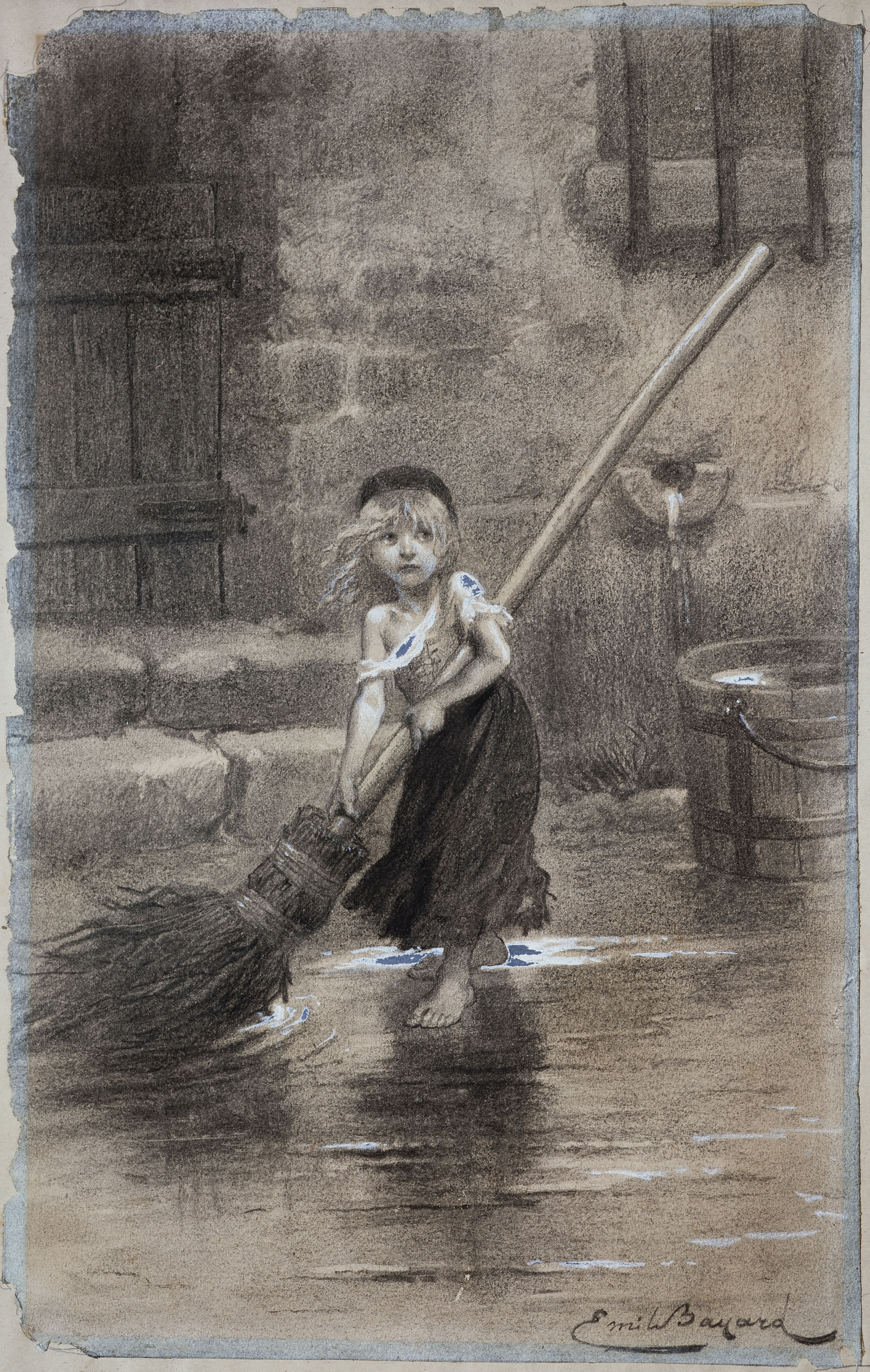
Illustration of the character Cosette, from Les Misérables, whose depiction may have been inspired by the life of Louise Julien

Writer Victor Hugo and poet Joseph Déjacque gave speeches at her funeral. Victor Hugo's speech was published in the Morning Advertiser on 29 July 1853 and in The Independent on 24 August 1853. The life of Louise Julien also may have inspired Hugo to create the character of Cosette in Les Misérables; their childhood is similar in several respects, having been born two years apart, the illegitimate child of a poor woman and an older rich man, orphaned, and left in poverty.

In the Almanach des femmes, Jeanne Deroin described her as "[a] woman poet loved by proletarians, because she was inspired by the love of freedom and humanity, and by compassion for the sufferings of her brothers."
