= Margarete Mauthner =

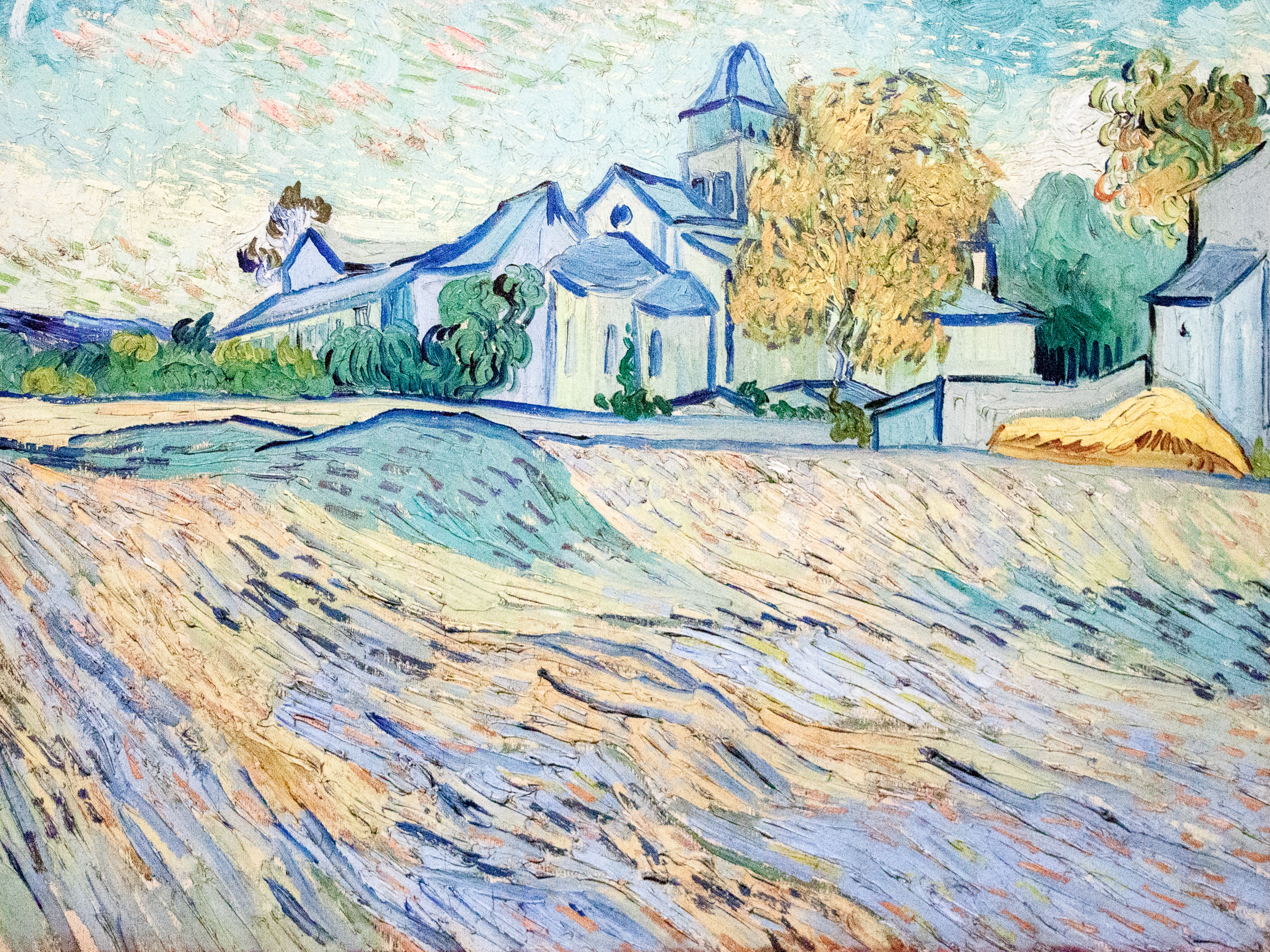
van Gogh's Chapel of Saint Remy was part of Mauthner's collection

Margarete Mauthner (born Margarete Alexander on 7 July 1863 in Berlin; died 24 April 1947 in Johannesburg) was a German art collector, patron, translator and author, persecuted by Nazis because of her Jewish origins. Her works were published by Bruno Cassirer.

== Personal life ==
Coming from an upper-middle-class family, she was educated first by a governess, then in a secondary school. She was married twice. With her first husband she had a daughter who died in 1946. Her second husband was Edmund Mauthner (1868-1909).

== Work as translator ==
Mautner translated monographs published by Bruno Cassirer as well as articles for Karl Scheffler's art magazine Kunst und Künstler. In 1917 she wrote her two-volume autobiography Rückblick, in which she traced the developments of the 19th century (the March Revolution, the founding of the Reich, the Gründerzeit, the crisis, the rise of the Jewish bourgeoisie).

The Alexander/Mauthner family lived at Matthäikirchstraße 1 in a house built in 1840, which was destroyed in World War II and is now the site of the Philharmonic Hall. Robert Musil called the building The Enchanted House. Mauthner's manuscript of her autobiography, Rückblick, was rediscovered by Musil biographer Karl Corino, and published in 2004 under the title Das verzauberte Haus. It describes the interconnections between Mauthner, her brother, her cousin, Paul Cassirer (like his brother Bruno a publisher), and Musil. Das verzauberte Haus also plays a significant role in Musil (Die Versuchung der stillen Veronika, Die Schwärmer) and was also the title of a 1908 Musil work.

Mauthner was instrumental in making Vincent van Gogh's art known in Germany, translating his letters.

Among Mauthner's many translations since 1904 is The Artful Art of Making Enemies by the Anglo-American painter James McNeill Whistler, which deals with the libel trial of the art critic John Ruskin, which significantly shaped today's views on defamation and (in)freedoms of (art) criticism.

== Nazi persecution and emigration ==
During the Nazi era, Mauthner helped family members to escape by providing financial support for their emigration. She fled Germany in 1939, leaving her possessions behind. She emigrated to South Africa, where she died in 1947.

== Lawsuits for the restitution of artworks from the Mauthner collection ==
Mauthner's heirs filed lawsuits to attempt to recover Van Gogh paintings that Mauthner had owned before the Nazis came to power. In 2003 they filed a claim, Orkin v. Taylor, against the Hollywood movie star Elizabeth Taylor for Van Gogh's View of the Hospice and the Chapel of Saint-Remy. Elizabeth Taylor's father, Francis Lenn Taylor, who was an art dealer in partnership with dealer Howard Young of Young Galleries. Francis Taylor had acquired the painting in 1963. The case was dismissed because the court held that California's statute of limitations had expired. Taylor later sold View of the Hospice and the Chapel of Saint-Remy at auction for 12.2 million euros.

Mauthner's heirs also filed a claim for the restitution of Van Gogh's drawing, View of Les Saintes-Maries-de-la-Mer, in the Oskar Reinhart collection "Am Römerholz", which is under the control of the Federal Office of Culture. They argued that Mauthner had sold under pressure of the threat she faced from Nazis. The Swiss government disagreed, saying that Reinhart had bought the work at a fair market price.

== Literary works ==
- Rückblick. 1917, 2 Bände, unveröffentlicht
- Das verzauberte Haus. Hrsg. und mit einem Nachwort von Karl Corino. Mit einem Vorwort der Urenkel von Margarete Mauthner. Transit, Berlin 2004, ISBN 978-3-88747-197-2.

=== As translator ===
- Briefe, Vincent van Gogh, Berlin, Cassirer, 1906, 144 S., 8. Auflage 1920
- Die artige Kunst sich Feinde zu machen mit einigen unterhaltenden Beispielen, wie ich die Ernsthaften dieser Erde zuerst mit Vorbedacht zur Raserei und dann in ihrem falschen Rechtsbewusstsein zu Unanständigkeit und Torheit gebracht habe, James McNeill Whistler
  - Berlin, Cassirer, 1909, 284 S.
  - Leipzig, Weimar, Kiepenheuer, 1984
  - Hanau/Main, Müller, 1984, 255 S., ISBN 3-7833-6402-7
  - Amsterdam (= Fundus Bücher 140), Dresden, Verlag der Kunst 1996, ISBN 90-5705-020-X, 288 S.
- Volpone, Ben Jonson, Initialen, Titelblatt und Deckel von Aubrey Beardsley, W. Drugulin, Leipzig, Berlin, Bruno Cassirer, 1910, Frontispiz, 163 S., Heliogravuren
- Der Sturz des Sejanus. Volpone oder der Fuchs. Der Bartholomäusmarkt, Ben Jonson, Berlin, Cassirer, 1912, 406 S.
- Édouard Manet: Erinnerungen, Antonin Proust, Veröff. von A. Barthélemy. Berlin, Bruno Cassirer, 1917, 133 S., 24 Abbildungen, 2. Auflage 1928
- Die Frau Konnetable (La Connestable), Honoré de Balzac, Lithographien von Lovis Corinth, Berlin, Bruno Cassirer, 1922, 22 S.
- Degas: Ambroise Vollard, Berlin, B. Cassirer, 1925, 111 S., 32 Lichtdrucktafeln
- Vom Blockhaus zum Wolkenkratzer: Eine Studie über amerikanische Architektur und Zivilisation (Sticks and Stones), Lewis Mumford, Berlin, Bruno Cassirer, 1925, 292 S., 25 Abbildungen

== Literature ==
- Anna-Carolin Augustin: Biographien jüdischer Frauen: Ein großbürgerliches Frauenleben für die moderne Kunst – Der Rückblick der Berliner Kunstsammlerin Margarete Mauthner In: Medaon 9, 2015, S. 16 (Digitalisat).
