= Monastery of Saint-Paul de Mausole =

Monastery and museum in Provence, France

- Monastère Saint-Paul-de-Mausole
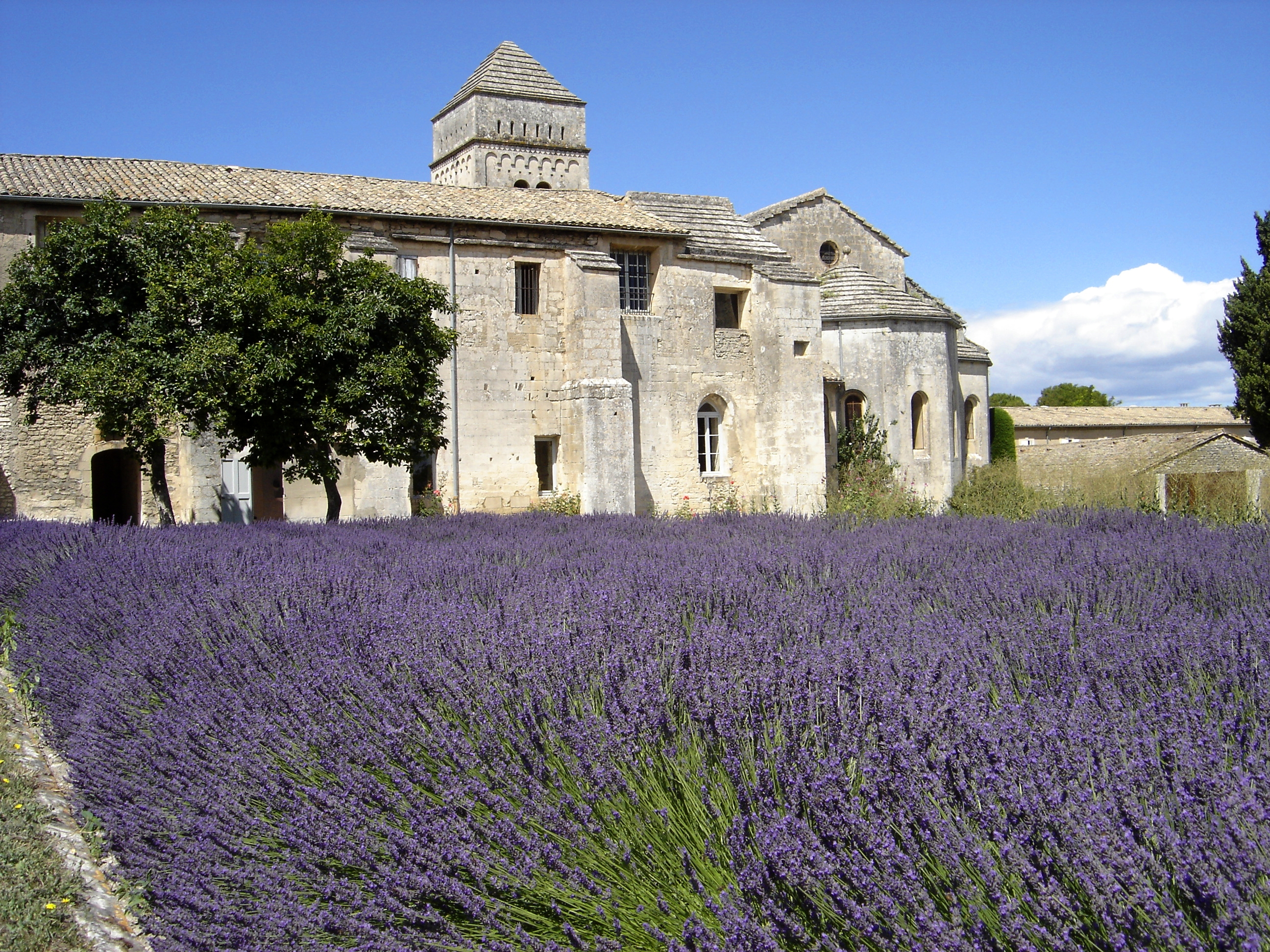
- Monastery of Saint-Paul de Mausole

- Location within France
- Interactive map of Monastery of Saint-Paul de Mausole

Monastery information
- Full name: Monastery of Saint-Paul de Mausole
- Established: 11th century
- Disestablished: French Revolution
- Diocese: Avignon

Architecture
- Functional status: secularized
- Heritage designation: National Historical Monument
- Designated date: 1883
- Style: Romanesque

Site
- Coordinates: 43.776668°N 4.835159°E

The Monastery of Saint Paul de Mausole (French: monastère Saint-Paul-de-Mausole) is a former Roman Catholic 10th-century Benedictine priory, then an 11th-century Augustinian monastery in Saint-Rémy-de-Provence, Provence, France. It was later administered by the Order of Saint Francis in 1605.

Several rooms of the building have been converted into a museum to honor the famed Dutch painter Vincent van Gogh, who stayed there in 1889–1890 at a time when the monastery had been converted to a lunatic asylum. Van Gogh created many paintings here, including the well-known The Starry Night.

== History ==
The monastery was built in the 11th century. Franciscan monks established a psychiatric asylum there in 1605.

== Van Gogh ==
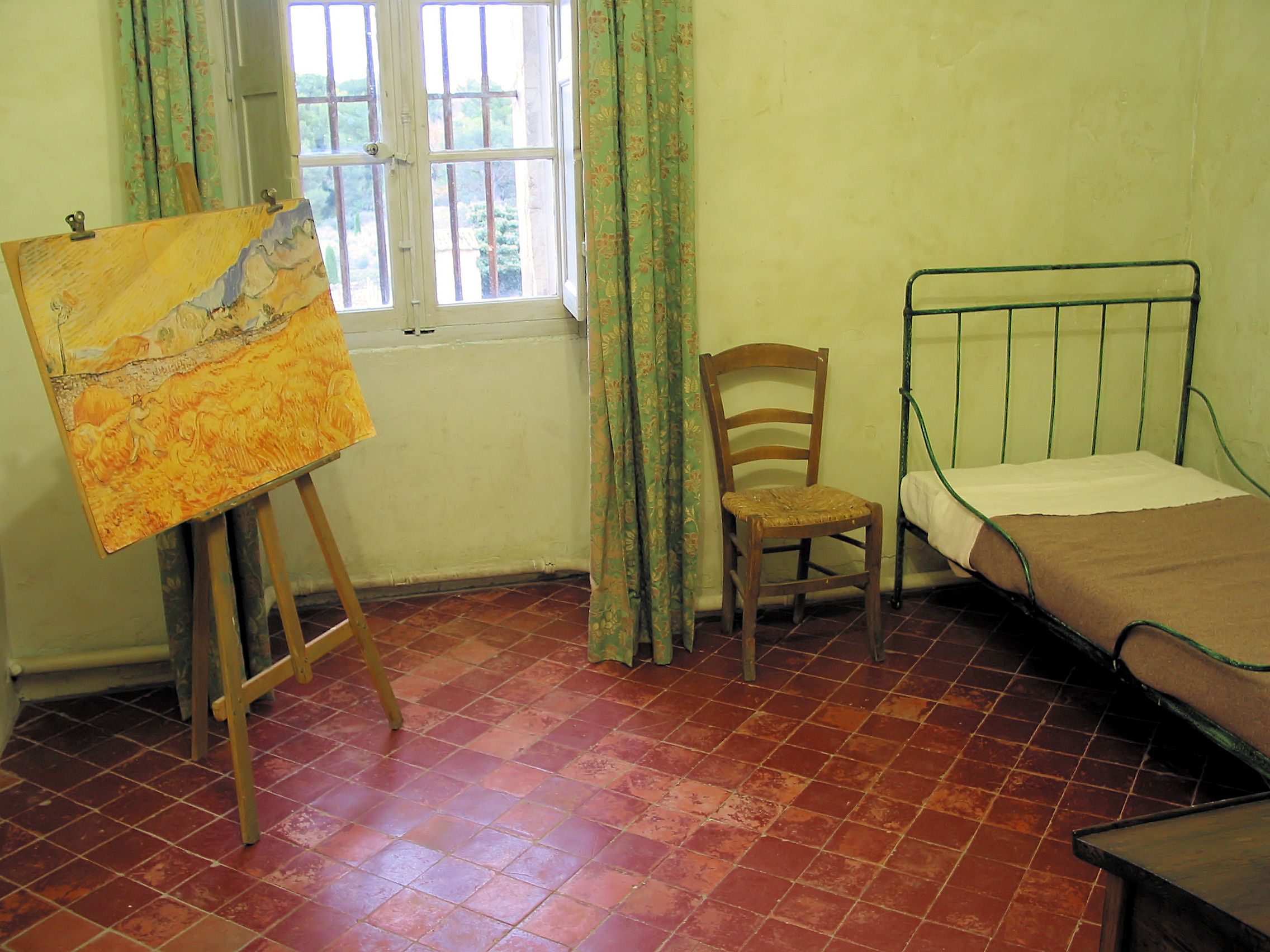
Vincent van Gogh's room in Saint-Paul de Mausole

In the aftermath of the 23 December 1888 breakdown that resulted in the self-mutilation of his left ear, Vincent van Gogh voluntarily admitted himself to the Saint-Paul-de-Mausole lunatic asylum on 8 May 1889. Housed in a former monastery, Saint-Paul-de-Mausole catered to the wealthy and was less than half full when Van Gogh arrived, allowing him to occupy not only a second-story bedroom but also a ground-floor room for use as a painting studio.

== See also ==
- Théophile Peyron
