= Jacques Gross =

French historian (1855–1928)

- Born: 2 March 1855; Mulhouse. Haut-Rhin, Grand Est, France
- Died: 4 October 1928 (aged 73); Geneva, Switzerland
- Other name: Jean-qui-marche
- Occupation: Historian
- Known for: Anarchism, freethought, freemasonry

Jacques Gross, or Gross-Fulpius (2 March 1855, in Mulhouse – 4 October 1928, in Geneva) was a member of the Jura Federation, historian of the Paris Commune and a contributor to libertarian and free-thinker newspapers. He contributed to the creation of the newspaper Le Réveil anarchiste in Geneva under the pseudonym of Jean-qui-marche.

== Biography ==
Gross was born in Alsace in 1855 and his family emigrated to Geneva in 1871. He was a traveling salesman for the Burrus tobacco factory in Boncourt, a profession which enabled him to smuggle illegal newspapers: L'Avant-Garde by Paul Brousse and Freiheit by Johann Most and Paul Schultze.

A very young member of the Jura Federation, he used the pseudonym of André as the delegate of the Porrentruy and Boncourt sections at the Eighth Congress of the International held in Bern from 26 to 29 October 1876.

In the same city, in 1877, he participated in the commemoration event of the Paris Commune.

=== Propagandist and internationalist ===
In 1890, he was among the founders, along with Luigi Bertoni, of the bilingual newspaper Le Réveil anarchiste. It financially supported other publications such as Les Temps nouvelles founded in 1895 by Jean Grave or Le Père Peinard by Émile Pouget.

Fluent in French, Italian and German, he was a friend of Élisée Reclus. and Peter Kropotkin (then residing in La Chaux-de-Fonds), he organized aid to the many activists who had taken refuge in, been imprisoned or expelled from Switzerland. In this context, he notably met James Guillaume, Adhémar Schwitzguébel, Andrea Costa, Henri Roorda, Ernest Cœurderoy, Luigi Galleani, Nicolas Stoinoff, etc. For more than thirty years, he helped Max Nettlau in his documentary research.

In 1891, he campaigned against the expulsion of Errico Malatesta and helped him flee to London in 1914 after the Red Week.

In 1894, the French police reported him as a member of the L'Avenir group of Geneva and suspected him of being a spy for Germany.

=== Freemason ===
In 1905, he was initiated into Freemasonry in Geneva in the La Fraternité lodge, belonging to the Grand Orient of France, he also belonged to the Sovereign Chapter and to the Philosophical Council La Fraternité in Geneva and he was venerable master of his lodge and his chapter, grand master of his Philosophical Council, 33rd degree of the Old and Accepted Scottish Rite and honorary member of the Grand College of Rites.

His personal archives constitute one of the first collections of the International Center for Research on Anarchism (CIRA) founded in Geneva in 1957. A large part of his correspondence was archived at the International Institute of Social History in Amsterdam.

His companion, Elisabeth Fulpius, daughter of the free-thinker Charles Fulpius and sculptor, participated in Sébastien Faure's Anarchist Encyclopedia by writing the article "Sculpture".

== Works ==
- La Franc-Maçonnerie sous la Commune (1871), conférence, Genève 1908.
- La franc-maçonnerie exposée aux profanes, Genève s.d.

=== Preface ===
- Ernest Cœurderoy, Jours d'exil, Paris, 1910.
- Jours d'exil, première partie, 1849-1851, Jacques Gross, Ernest Cœurderoy, Raoul Vaneigem, Max Nettlau, Saint-Imier, Canevas, 1991, ISBN 2-88382-011-2.
