= Ernest Cœurderoy =

French writer (1825–1862)

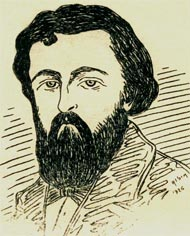
- Born: 23 January 1825; Avallon, France
- Died: 26 October 1862 (aged 37); Geneva, Switzerland
- Occupations: Physician, journalist
- Movement: Revolutionary socialism

Ernest Cœurderoy (1825–1862) was a French physician and revolutionary journalist. A participant in the French Revolution of 1848, he was forced into exile after its suppression. In Switzerland, he wrote extensively on the issue of socialism, synthesising his own form from mutualism and collectivism, and was harshly critical of the French republican leadership. He spent his remaining years in exile, even refusing a political amnesty from the French government, before committing suicide. His works were later rediscovered by the anarchists Max Nettlau and Jacques Gross, who claimed him to have been an early figure of the French anarchist movement.

== Biography ==
Ernest Cœurderoy was born on 22 January 1825, in the French commune of Avallon. At the age of 17, he moved to Paris to study medicine, graduating in 1845 and becoming an intern at a Parisian hospital.

Following the French Revolution of 1848, he became involved in revolutionary politics, becoming a revolutionary socialist in the wake of the June Days uprising and joining a socialist student committee. He was involved in the 13 June 1849 uprising and fled to Switzerland following its suppression, being sentence in absentia to deportation.

He initially settled in Geneva, but was forced to move to Nyon and then Lausanne after the Swiss government prohibited French exiles from living near the France–Switzerland border. Influenced by Charles Fourier, Pierre Leroux, Pierre-Joseph Proudhon, he wrote extensively on the subject of socialism during his time in exile, declaring that "Socialism is Liberty, Equality and Fraternity, it is the Truth coming from the people, it is the right to live guaranteed by work, the Republic, the emancipation of human understanding, free and compulsory public education, the distribution among all of the wealth produced by all." His own version of socialism represented a synthesis of mutualism and collectivism, calling for both collective ownership over the means of production and individual ownership of the products of ones' own labour. He was also incredibly critical of French Republican leaders, who he held responsible for the defeat of the 1848 Revolution. As he believed neither the Western bourgeoisie or proletariat was capable of leading a revolution, he called for Cossacks to invade Western Europe, as he believed it would be the only way to provoke a social revolution.

In March 1851, he was expelled from Switzerland and went to Belgium, but he was quickly expelled from there too, forcing him to move to Britain. He later moved to Spain and then to Italy. When the government of Napoleon III proclaimed a political amnesty of 1859, Cœurderoy refused to accept it, having already succumbed to mental illness. He committed suicide in Geneva on 26 October 1862. François Jannot was the sole person in attendance at his funeral.

== Legacy ==
He was posthumously claimed to have been an anarchist by the German historian Max Nettlau. His writings were rediscovered in 1876 by Jacques Gross, who published them in Le Révolté. Gross and Nettlau collected them together into the collection Jours d'Exil, which was published in 1910 and 1911.

== Bibliography ==
- Maitron, Jean; Enckell, Marianne (5 August 2021) [22 October 2013]. "COEURDEROY Ernest [CŒURDEROY Jean, Charles, Herneste". Le Maitron (in French).
- Marshall, Peter (1992). Demanding the Impossible: A History of Anarchism. Fontana. p. 434. ISBN 978-0-00-686245-1.
