= Marie Gasquet =

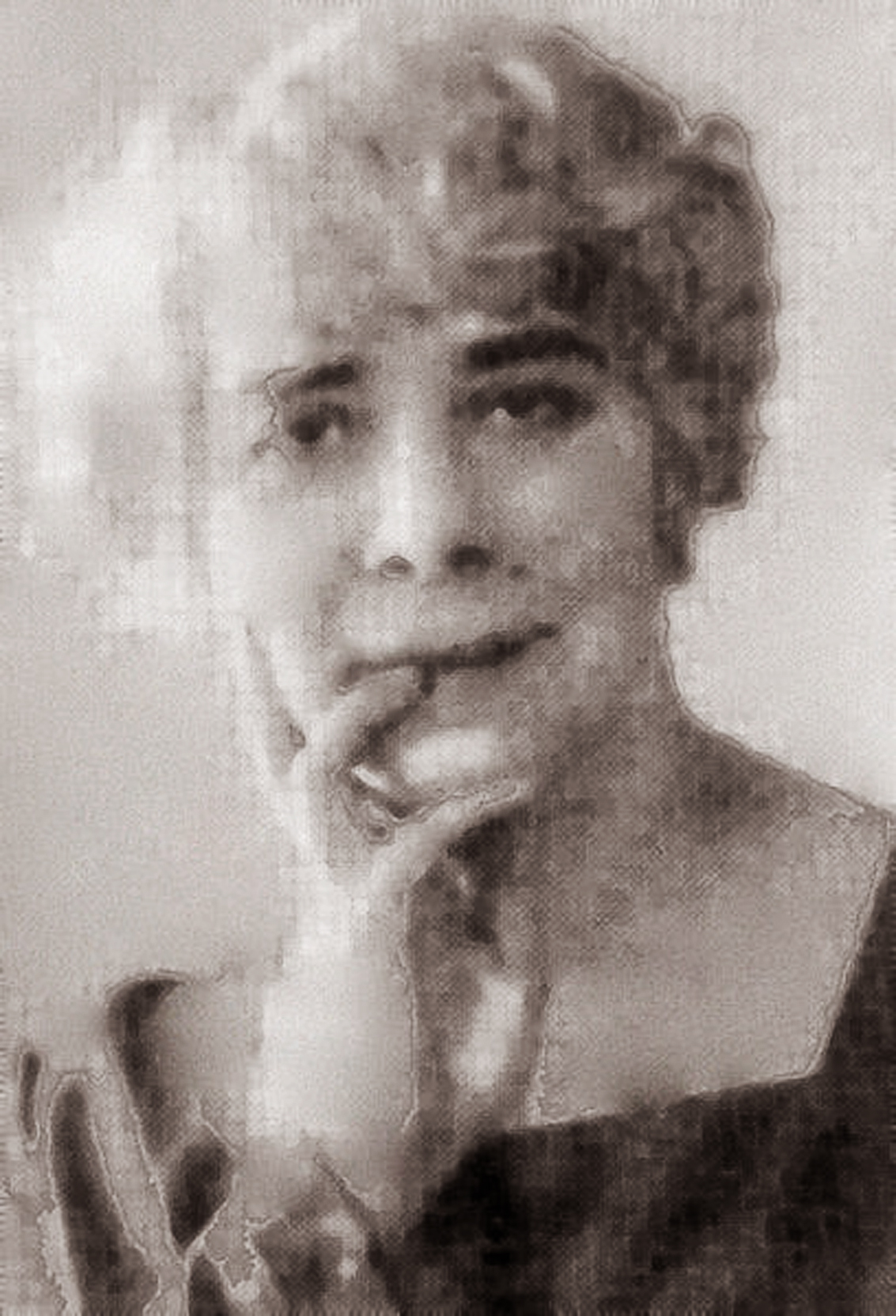
- Marie Gasquet in 1919
- Born: 1872; Saint-Rémy-de-Provence, Bouches-du-Rhône, France
- Died: 1960 (aged 87–88); Saint-Rémy-de-Provence, Bouches-du-Rhône, France
- Occupation: Novelist
- Spouse: Joachim Gasquet
- Parent: Marius Girard
- Relatives: Frédéric Mistral (godfather)

Marie Gasquet (French pronunciation: [maʁi ɡaskɛ]; 1872–1960) was a French regionist writer from Provence.

== Biography ==
=== Early life ===
Marie Gasquet was born in Saint-Rémy-de-Provence, Bouches-du-Rhône in 1872. Her father, Marius Girard, was a Provençal poet. Her godfather was Frédéric Mistral.

=== Career ===
She moved to Paris where she worked for Flammarion and became a successful novelist. She was hailed as queen of the Felibrige in 1892.

=== Personal life ===
She was married to Joachim Gasquet, a friend of Paul Cézanne's.

She died in 1960.

== Bibliography ==
- Une Enfance provençale
- Sainte Jeanne d'Arc ...
- Ce que les femmes disent des femmes
- Tante la Capucine
- Une Fille de saint François
- La Fête-Dieu
- Capharnaüm
- Le Métier de Pénélope
- Sainte Bernadette de Lourdes
- La vénérable Anne-Madeleine Remuzat
