= Joachim Gasquet =

French author, poet, and art critic

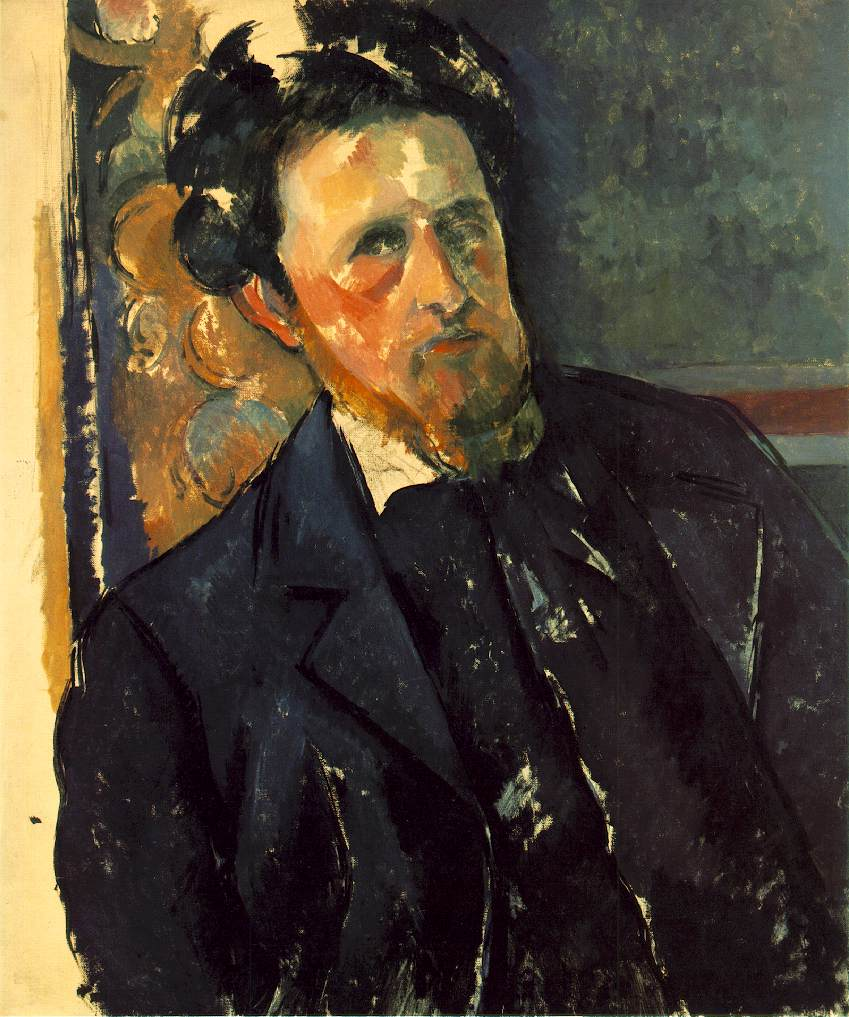
- Portrait of Gasquet by Paul Cézanne (1896)
- Born: 31 March 1873; Aix-en-Provence, Bouches-du-Rhône, France
- Died: 6 May 1921 (aged 48)
- Occupation(s): Poet, author, art critic
- Spouse: Marie Gasquet
- Children: Arno Gasquet (great-grand-nephew)
- Relatives: Marius Girard (father-in-law)

Joachim Gasquet (31 March 1873 – 6 May 1921) was a French author, poet, and art critic.

== Biography ==
=== Early life ===
Joachim Gasquet was born in 1873 in Aix-en-Provence.

=== Career ===
He was an author, poet and art critic. He is best known for his writing about the artists of his era, particularly Paul Cézanne, a friend and business partner.

His 1921 book, Cézanne, is a testament to the life of the artist, whose work Gasquet had known since an 1895 exhibition at Aix-en-Provence.

=== Personal life ===
He married Marie Gasquet in 1896.

He died in 1921.

== Bibliography ==
- Cézanne
- Narcisse
- Les Printemps
- Les Champs de la Foret
- Il y a une volupte dans la douleur
- Les Bienfaits de la guerre
- Les Chants seculaires
- Le Bucher secret
- L'Arbre et les vents
- Tu ne tueras point
- Quinze aquarelles de pierre laprade pour les chansons d'arlequin.
