= Saint-Rémy-de-Provence =

Commune in Provence-Alpes-Côte d'Azur, France

Saint-Rémy-de-Provence Sant Romieg de Provença (Occitan)
- Commune
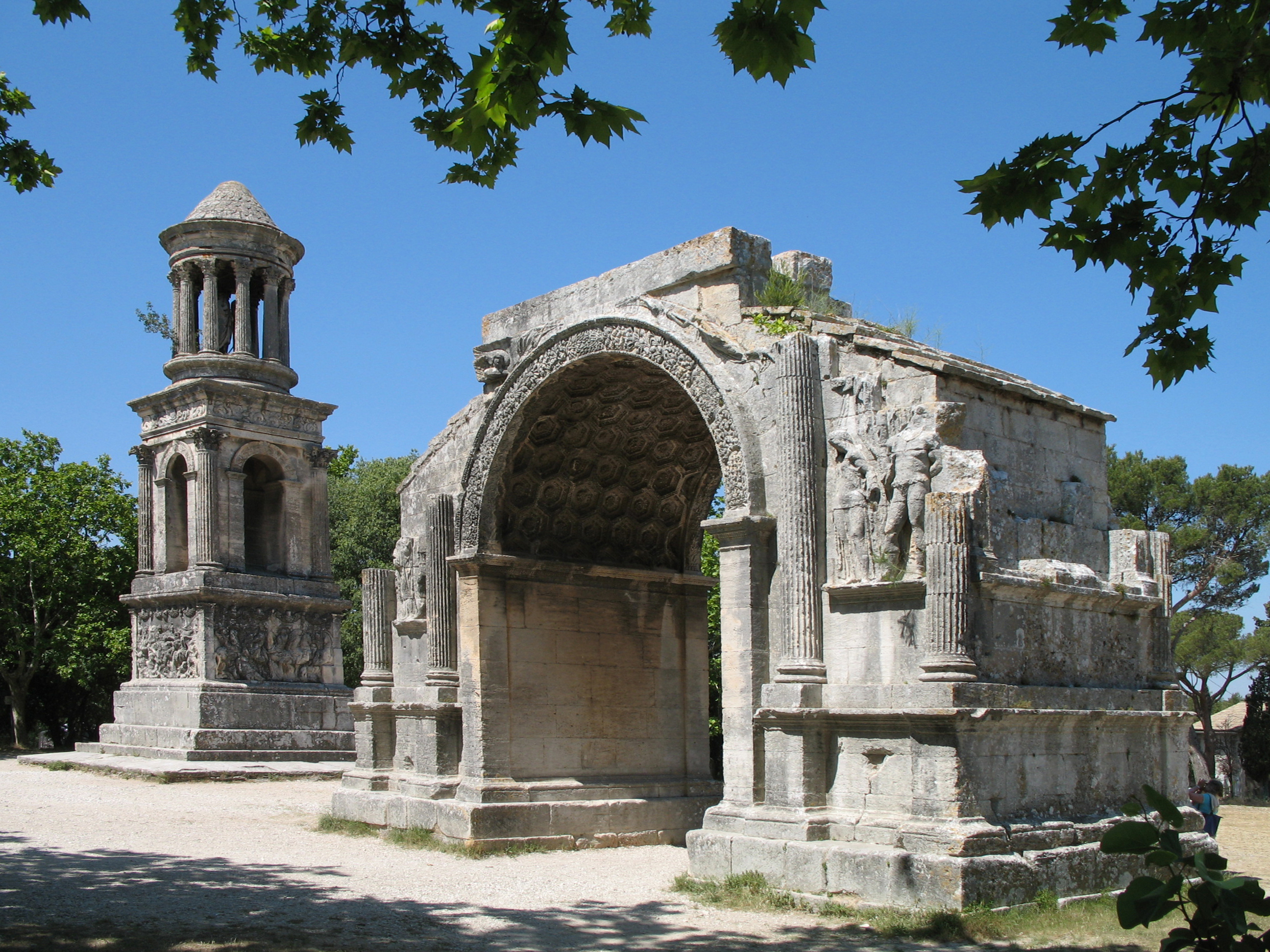
- Roman site 'Les Antiques' of Glanum, with the Mausoleum (left) and the Arch (right)

- Coat of arms
- Location of Saint-Rémy-de-Provence
- Location within France Location within Provence-Alpes-Côte d'Azur
- Coordinates: 43°47′24″N 4°49′57″E
- Country: France
- Region: Provence-Alpes-Côte d'Azur
- Department: Bouches-du-Rhône
- Arrondissement: Arles
- Canton: Salon-de-Provence-1
- Intercommunality: Vallée des Baux-Alpilles

Government
  - Mayor (2026–32): Romain Thomas
- Area^{1}: 89.09 km^{2} (34.40 sq mi)
- Elevation: 60 m (200 ft)
- Highest elevation: 392 m (1,286 ft)
- Lowest elevation: 7 m (23 ft)
- Population (2023): 9,599
  - Density: 107.7/km^{2} (279.1/sq mi)
- Time zone: UTC+01:00 (CET)
  - Summer (DST): UTC+02:00 (CEST)
- INSEE/Postal code: 13100 /13210
- ^{1} French Land Register data, which excludes lakes, ponds, glaciers > 1 km^{2} (0.386 sq mi or 247 acres) and river estuaries.

Saint-Rémy-de-Provence (French pronunciation: [sɛ̃ ʁemi də pʁɔvɑ̃s]; Provençal: Sant Romieg de Provença (classical norm) and Sant Roumié de Prouvènço (Mistralian norm)) is a commune in the Bouches-du-Rhône department in the Provence-Alpes-Côte d'Azur region in Southern France. It is often referred to simply as Saint-Rémy, its official name until 12 April 1953. Located in the northern part of the Alpilles, of which it is the main town, its population is about 9,600.

== History ==
The town, which has been inhabited since prehistory, was named after Saint Remigius under the Latin name Villa Sancti Remigii.

From May 1889 to May 1890, Vincent van Gogh was a patient at the Saint-Paul Asylum in Saint-Rémy-de-Provence, and painted some of his most memorable works, including The Starry Night, which features the town.

Some of Vincent van Gogh's paintings in Saint-Rémy
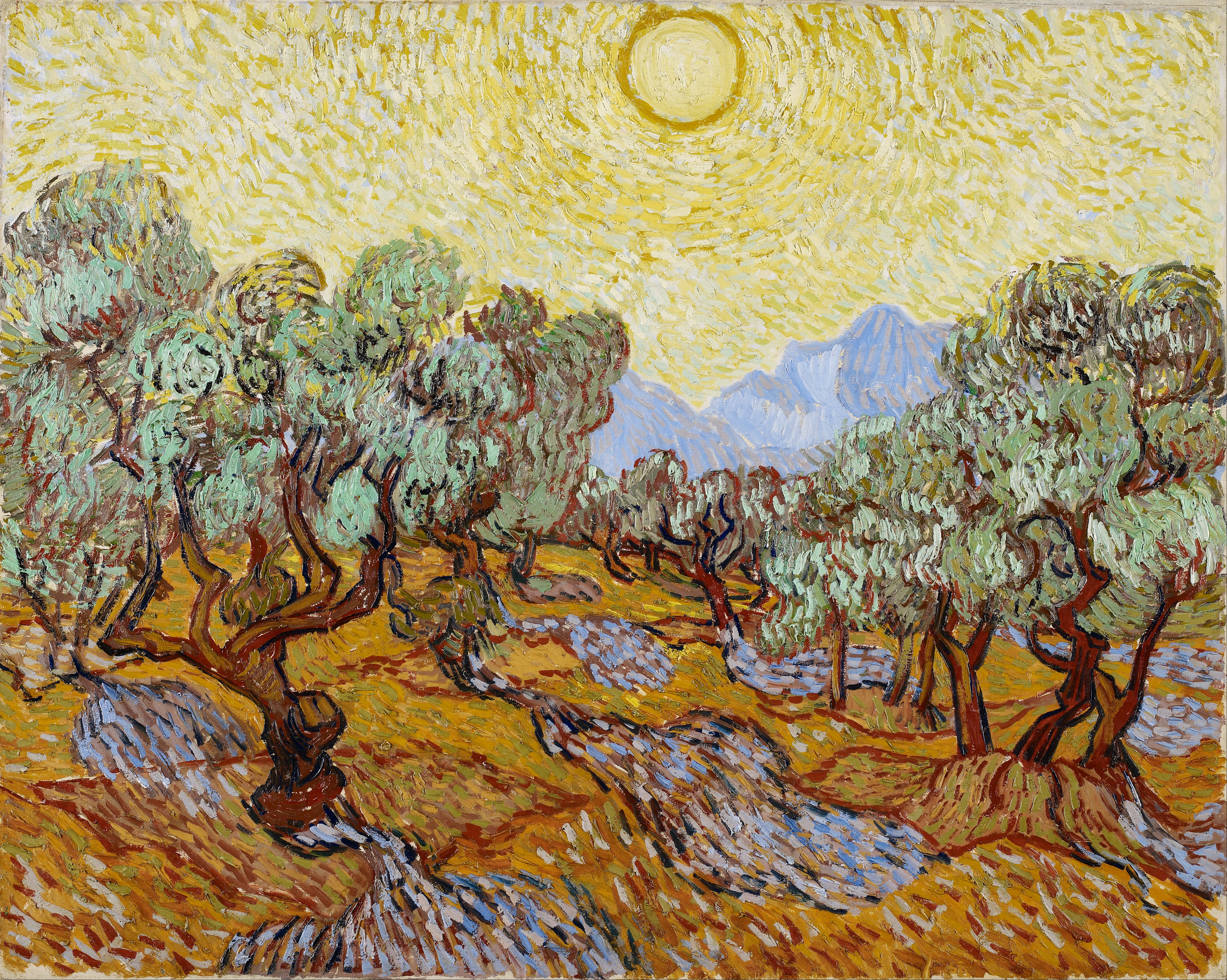
Olive Trees with yellow sky and sun, 1889

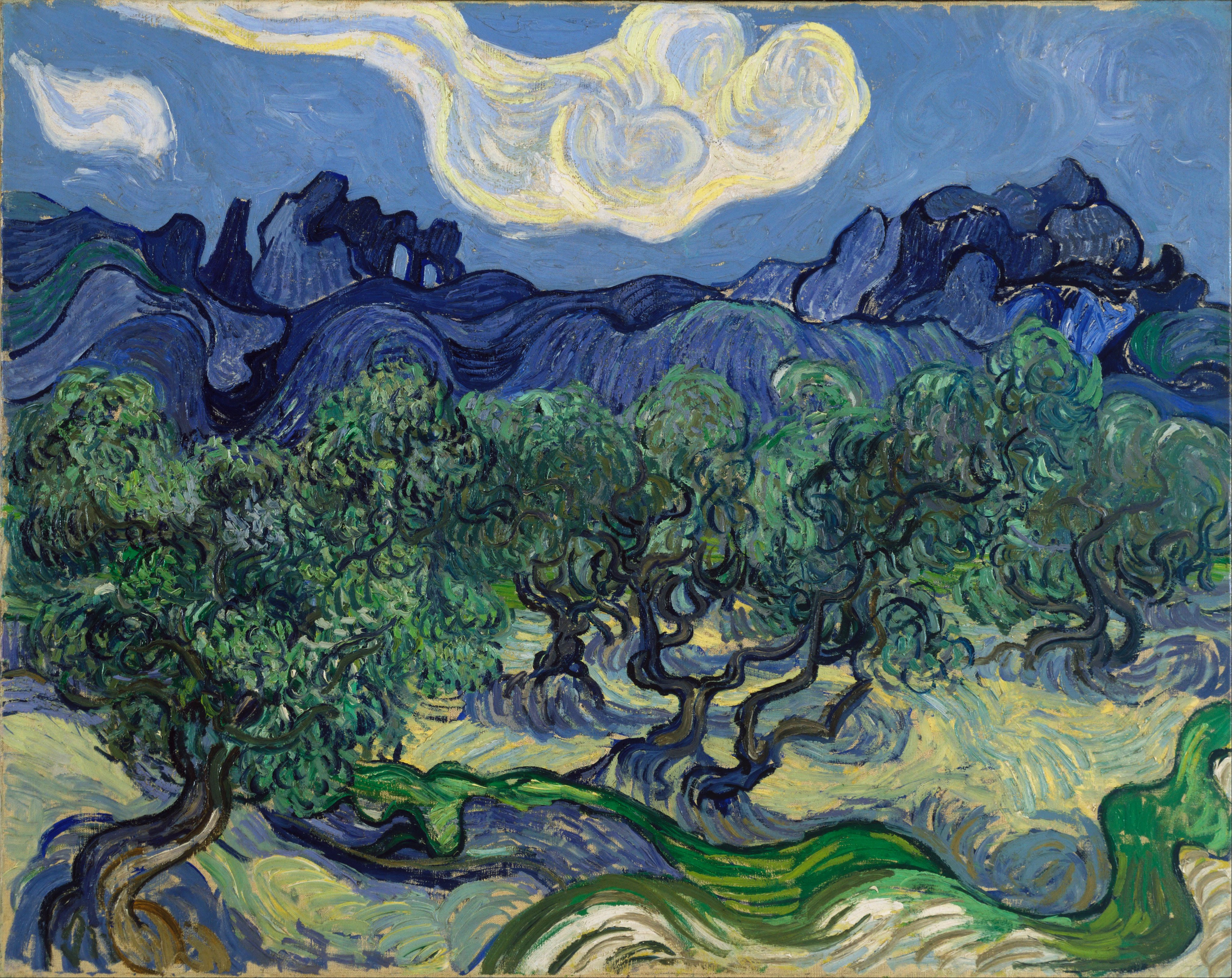
Olive Trees with the Alpilles in the Background, 1889

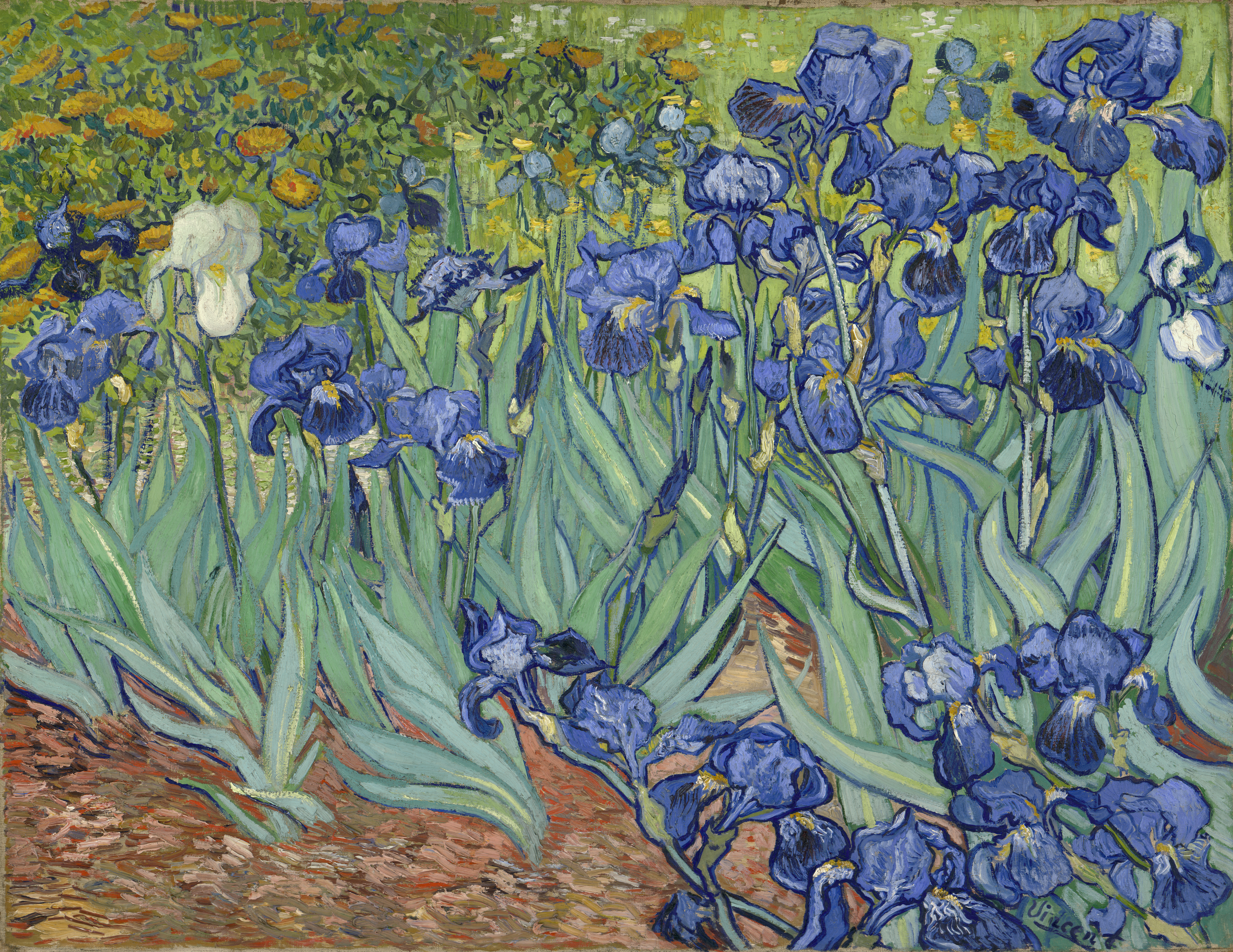
Irises, 1889

The Starry Night, 1889

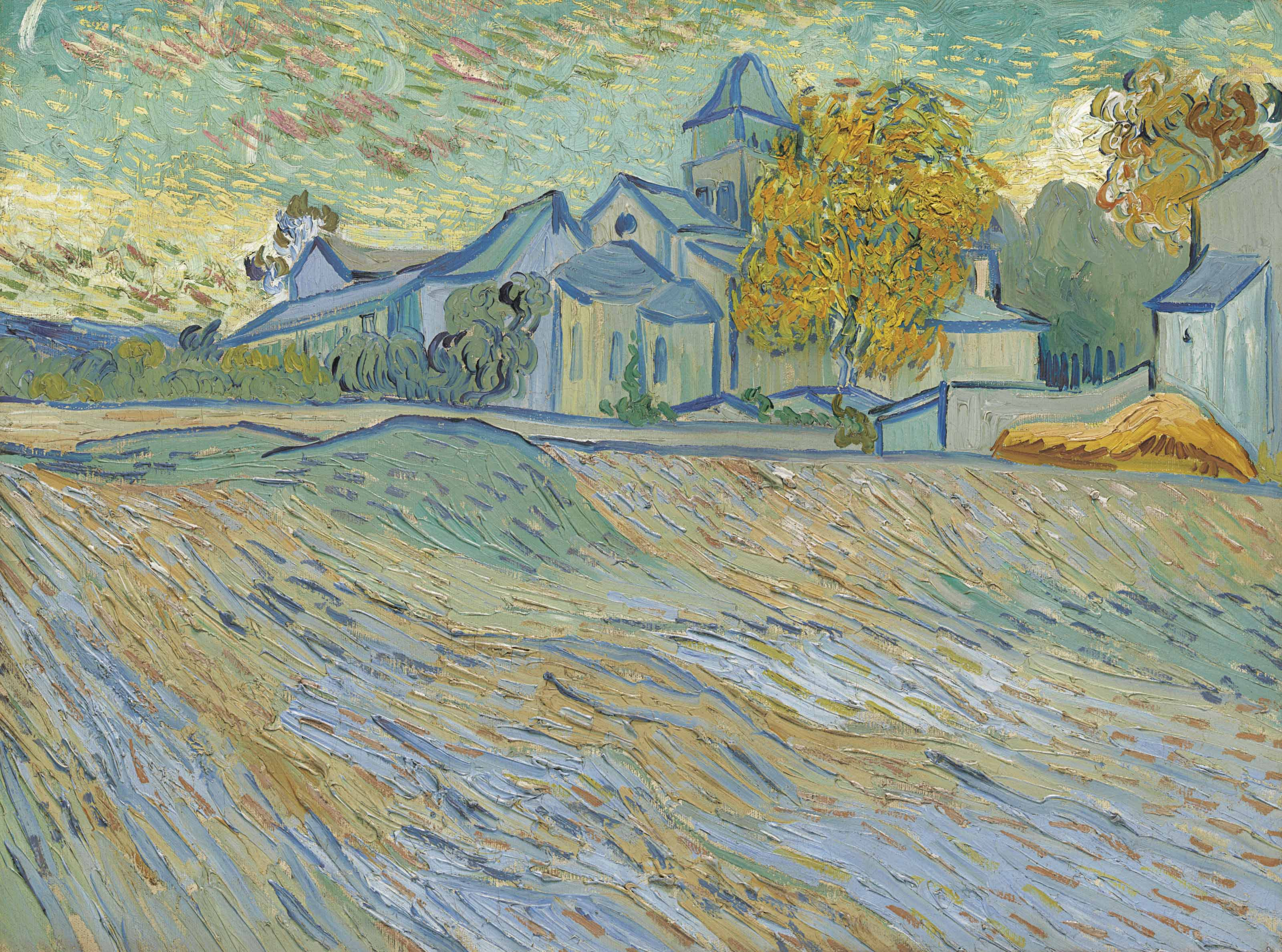
View of the Asylum and Chapel of Saint-Rémy, 1889

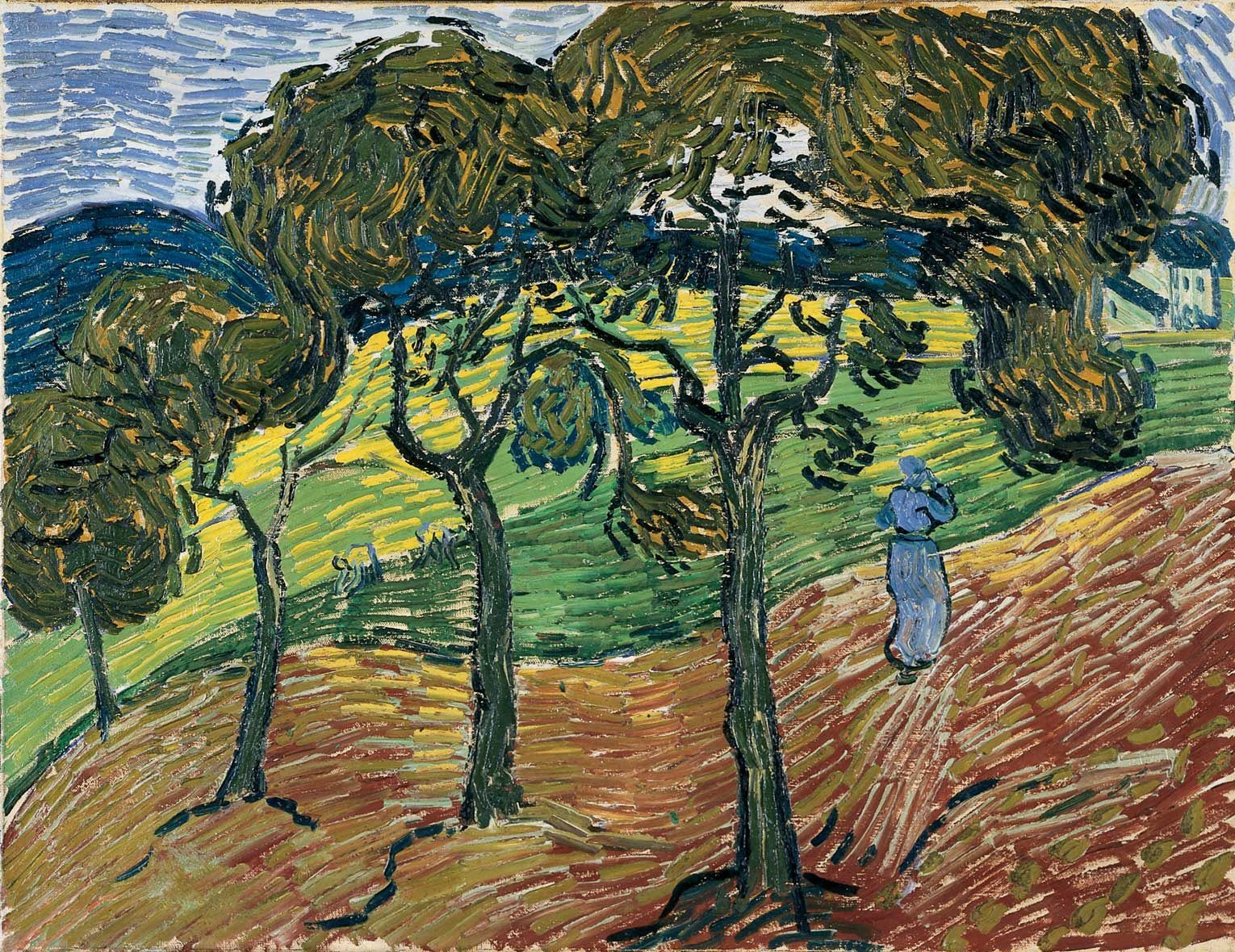
Landscape with Trees and Figures, 1889

== Geography ==
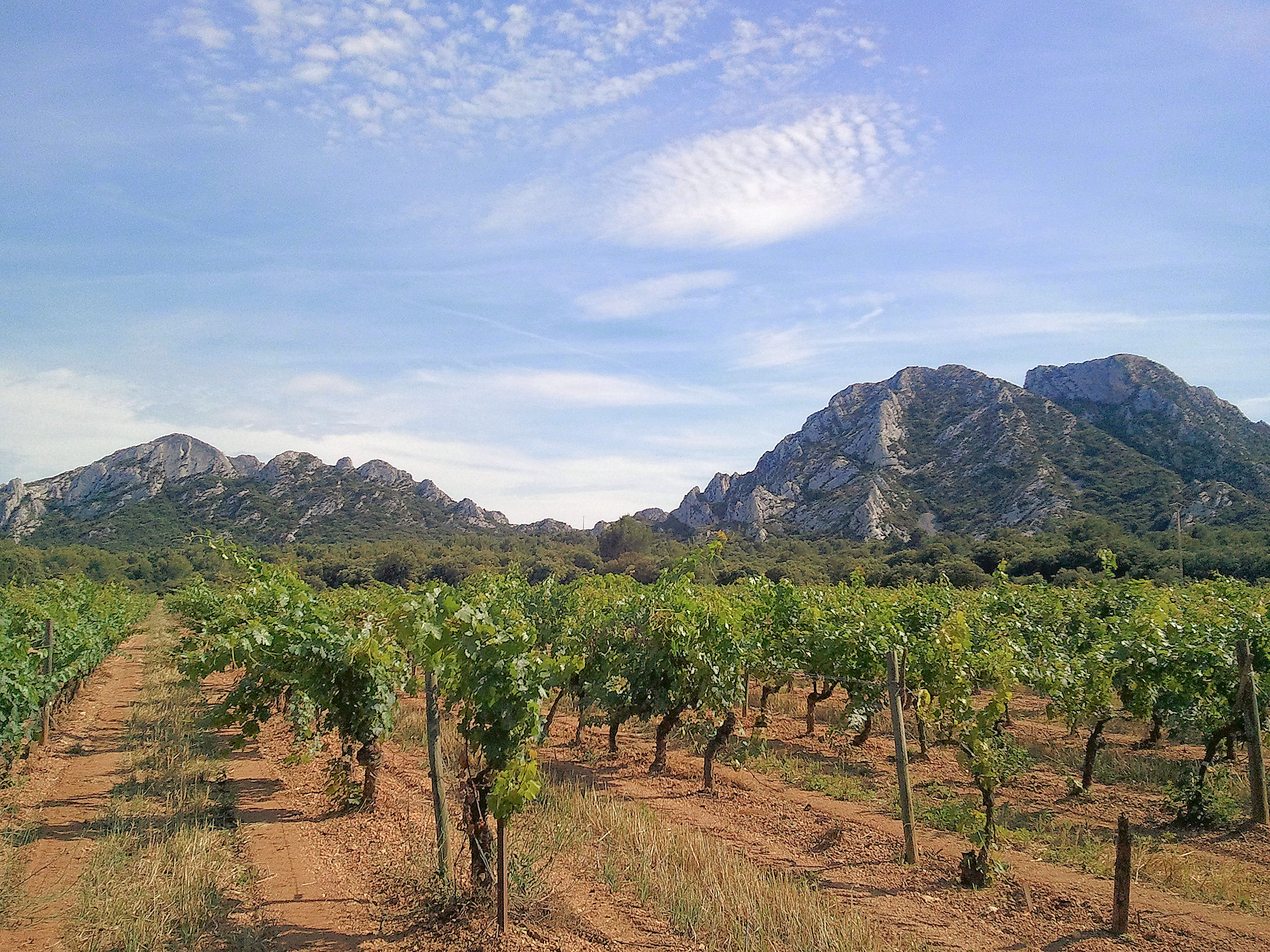
Vineyards in Saint-Rémy

Saint-Rémy-de-Provence is situated about 20 km (12 mi) south of Avignon, just north of the Alpilles mountain range.

== Transportation ==
The Avignon TGV high-speed train station is 20 km (12 mi) from the city. The closest airports are serving the cities of Avignon, Nîmes and Marseille.

Also, there are several highways and main roads which serve Saint-Rémy. The A7 autoroute, which runs down the Valley of the Rhône and connects Lyon to Marseille via Orange, is about 12 km (7.5 mi) east of Saint-Rémy. The A54 autoroute runs from Nîmes to Salon-de-Provence, passing through Arles, 17 km (11 mi) away. Finally, the A9 autoroute is 20 km to the northwest and runs from Orange to Perpignan via Montpellier.

== Climate ==
The climate in the Alpilles is considered Mediterranean. Winters there are gentle and dry, and summers are hot and dry. The highest average temperature is recorded in July and August 29 °C (84 °F), and the lowest in December and January 3 °C (37 °F). The rainiest month is January with an average of 7 rainy days, compared with July, the driest month, with an average of 2 rainy days. The Alpilles region receives more precipitation than the French Rivera, 1–2 cm more per year. There are about 30 days of frost per year. Snow is rare, but can be heavy when it does fall.

== Demographics ==
Historical population

Year	Pop.	±% p.a.
1793	5,055	—
1800	5,055	+0.00%
1806	5,737	+2.13%
1821	5,181	−0.68%
1831	5,464	+0.53%
1836	5,007	−1.73%
1841	5,930	+3.44%
1846	6,077	+0.49%
1851	6,124	+0.15%
1856	6,340	+0.70%
1861	6,348	+0.03%
1866	6,315	−0.10%
1872	6,030	−0.77%
1876	5,999	−0.13%
1881	5,815	−0.62%
1886	5,813	−0.01%
1891	5,636	−0.62%
1896	5,976	+1.18%
1901	6,009	+0.11%

Year	Pop.	±% p.a.
1906	6,148	+0.46%
1911	6,174	+0.08%
1921	5,938	−0.39%
1926	6,369	+1.41%
1931	6,598	+0.71%
1936	6,723	+0.38%
1946	6,877	+0.23%
1954	6,893	+0.03%
1962	7,582	+1.20%
1968	8,044	+0.99%
1975	7,923	−0.22%
1982	8,402	+0.84%
1990	9,340	+1.33%
1999	9,806	+0.54%
2007	10,251	+0.56%
2012	10,406	+0.30%
2017	9,893	−1.01%
2023	9,599	−0.50%

Source: EHESS and INSEE (1968–2023)

== Sights ==
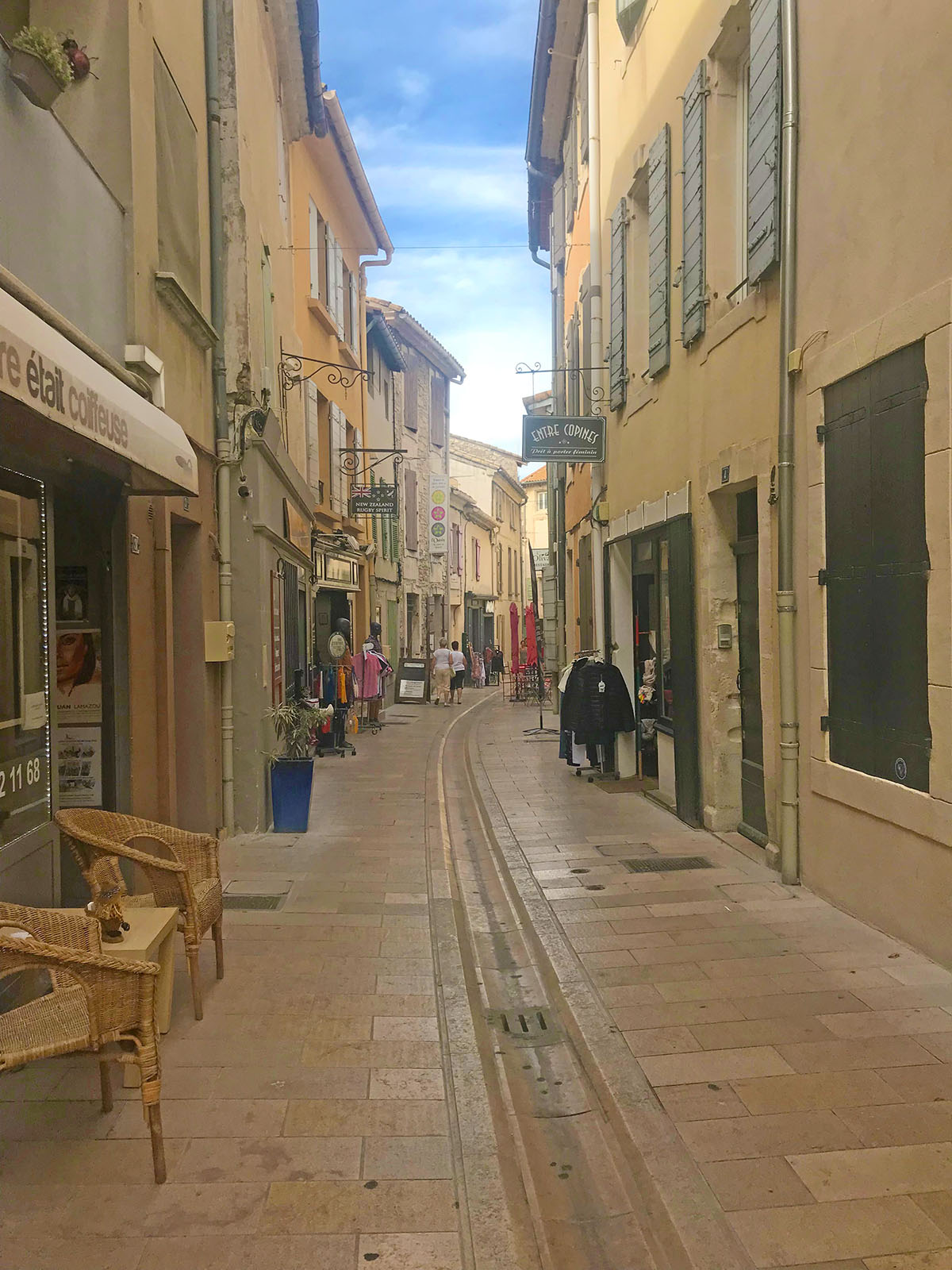
The Rue du Château in the city centre of Saint-Rémy-de-Provence

The ruins of the Roman city of Glanum, including a triumphal arch, can still be seen on the southern outskirts of the city.

The Saint-Paul Asylum in Saint-Rémy-de-Provence is where Vincent van Gogh was a patient, from May 1889 to May 1890, and where he painted some of his most memorable works, including The Starry Night which features the town.

== Notable people ==
- Marie Andrieu (1851-1911), anarchist, cartomancer and editor of newspapers was born in the town
- Pierre Daboval (1918–2015), artist, lived for many years in Saint-Rémy-de-Provence
- Marie Gasquet (1872–1960), a Provençale novelist and queen of the Félibrige
- Vincent van Gogh, from May 1889 to May 1890, the famous Dutch painter was admitted to the Saint-Paul psychiatric hospital in Saint-Remy-de-Provence. He painted several paintings, including Starry Night.
- Louis-Thomas Chabert de Joncaire, (1670–1739), French army officer and interpreter in New France
- Princess Caroline of Monaco and her children lived in Saint-Rémy for several years following the death of her second husband, Stefano Casiraghi
- Pablo Daniel Magee, writer, journalist and playwright grew up in Saint-Rémy-de-Provence
- Nostradamus, a 16th-century author of prophecies

== Twin towns ==
Saint-Rémy-de-Provence is twinned with:

- (Germany) Pfarrkirchen
- (Italy) Bientina

== See also ==
- Communes of the Bouches-du-Rhône department
- Domaine Henri Milan
