= Hedwig Stern =

German Jewish art collector

Hedwig Stern (née Eichengrün; 1898-1983) was a German Jewish art collector.

== Life ==
Hedwig Stern, born Eichengrün in 1898, was the daughter of a textile company owner. She married Fritz Stern (d. 1955).

Throughout her life, she searched for a missing painting, but despite her "serious and diligent efforts," as noted in a report by Petropoulos submitted in a lawsuit, she was never able to locate it. Stern died in 1983.

== Art collection ==
Stern's art collection included works by van Gogh, Richard Seewald, Max Unold and other artworks which have ended up in museums.

== Nazi persecution ==
When Hitler came to power in Germany, Stern was persecuted due to her Jewish heritage. As mandated by the Nazi's September 1935 Nuremberg Laws, Hedwig Stern was stripped of her German citizenship. In December, she and her husband Fritz fled Munich, leaving behind the art collection. The Sterns successfully escaped Germany in December 1936, arriving in New York in early January 1937. Afterward, they relocated to Berkeley, then Pasadena .

One of the painting left behin was Olive Picking (1889) by Vincent van Gogh. Hedwig's attorney, Kurt Mosbacher, was instructed to liquidate her assets, and Olive Picking was listed among the items for disposal.

== Claims for restitution ==
In 2023, her heirs filed a lawsuit against the Basil & Elise Goulandris Foundation in Athens and the Metropolitan Museum of Art in New York for the return of Olive Picking. The complaint alleges that the work was 'repeatedly and secretly trafficked' after World War II.

Stern's heirs have filed search requests for art looted during the Nazi era on the German Lost Art Foundation database.
