= View of Auvers with Church (van Gogh) =

Painting by Vincent van Gogh

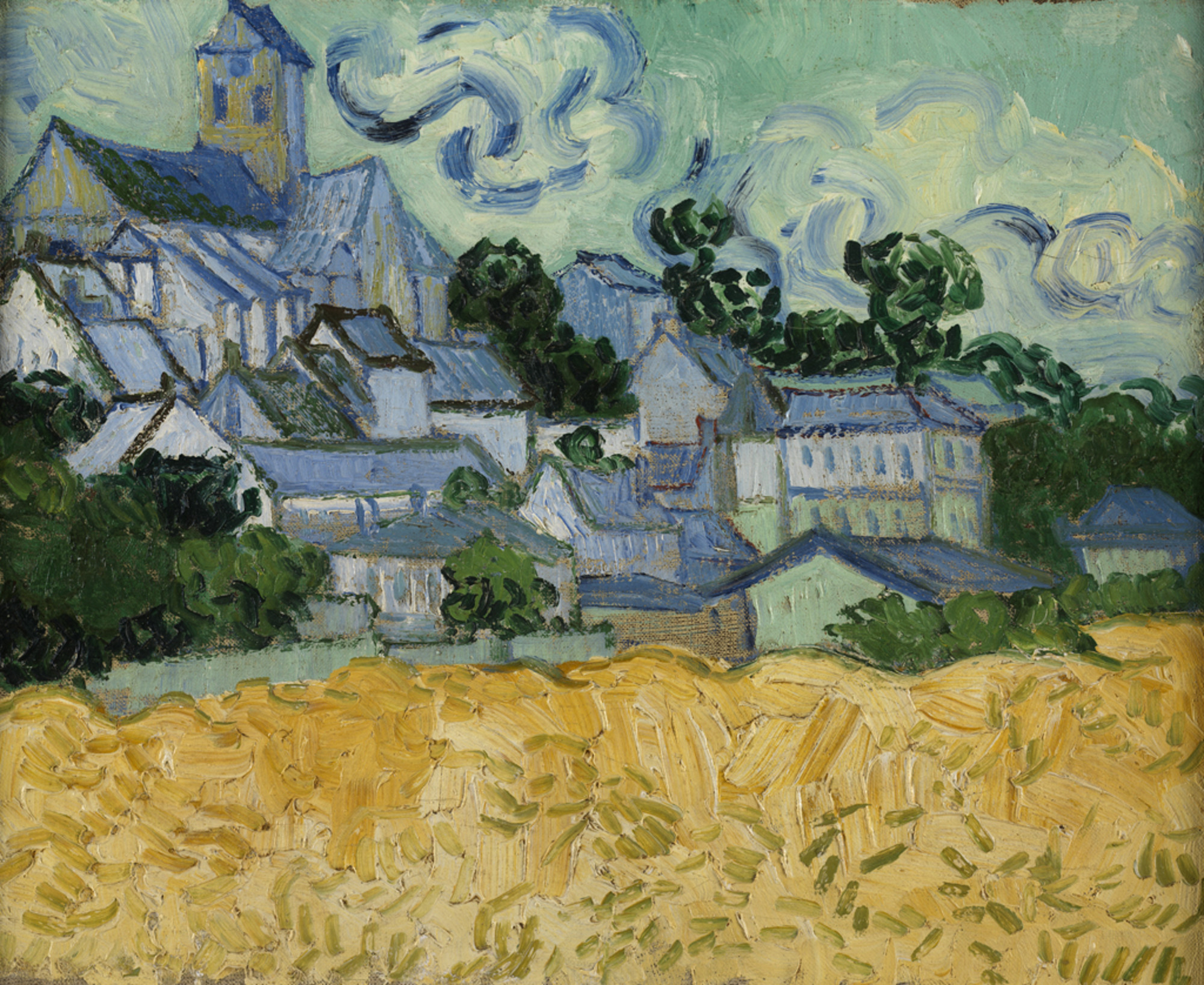
- Artist: Vincent van Gogh
- Year: 1890
- Catalogue: F800; JH2122
- Medium: Oil on canvas
- Movement: Post Impressionism
- Dimensions: 34 cm × 42.1 cm (13.3 in × 16.5 in)
- Location: Rhode Island School of Design Museum, Providence
- Website: risdmuseum.org/art-design/collection

View of Auvers with Church is a post-impressionist oil painting by Vincent van Gogh, completed in July 1890 and which hangs at the Rhode Island School of Design Museum in Providence. The work is one of two known paintings by Van Gogh depicting the Église Notre-Dame-de-l'Assomption in Auvers-sur-Oise, the other named The Church at Auvers.

== Description ==
The painting features yellow wheatfields in the front with a hillside view of the parts of Auvers-sur-Oise around the church and curling clouds and skies above the town. The church of Auvers is located at the top-left of the painting and rises high above the rooftops of the surrounding houses. The painting is on a relatively small canvas for Van Gogh's works, with dimensions of only 34 × 42.1 cm in contrast to The Church at Auvers, which has 74 cm × 94 cm.

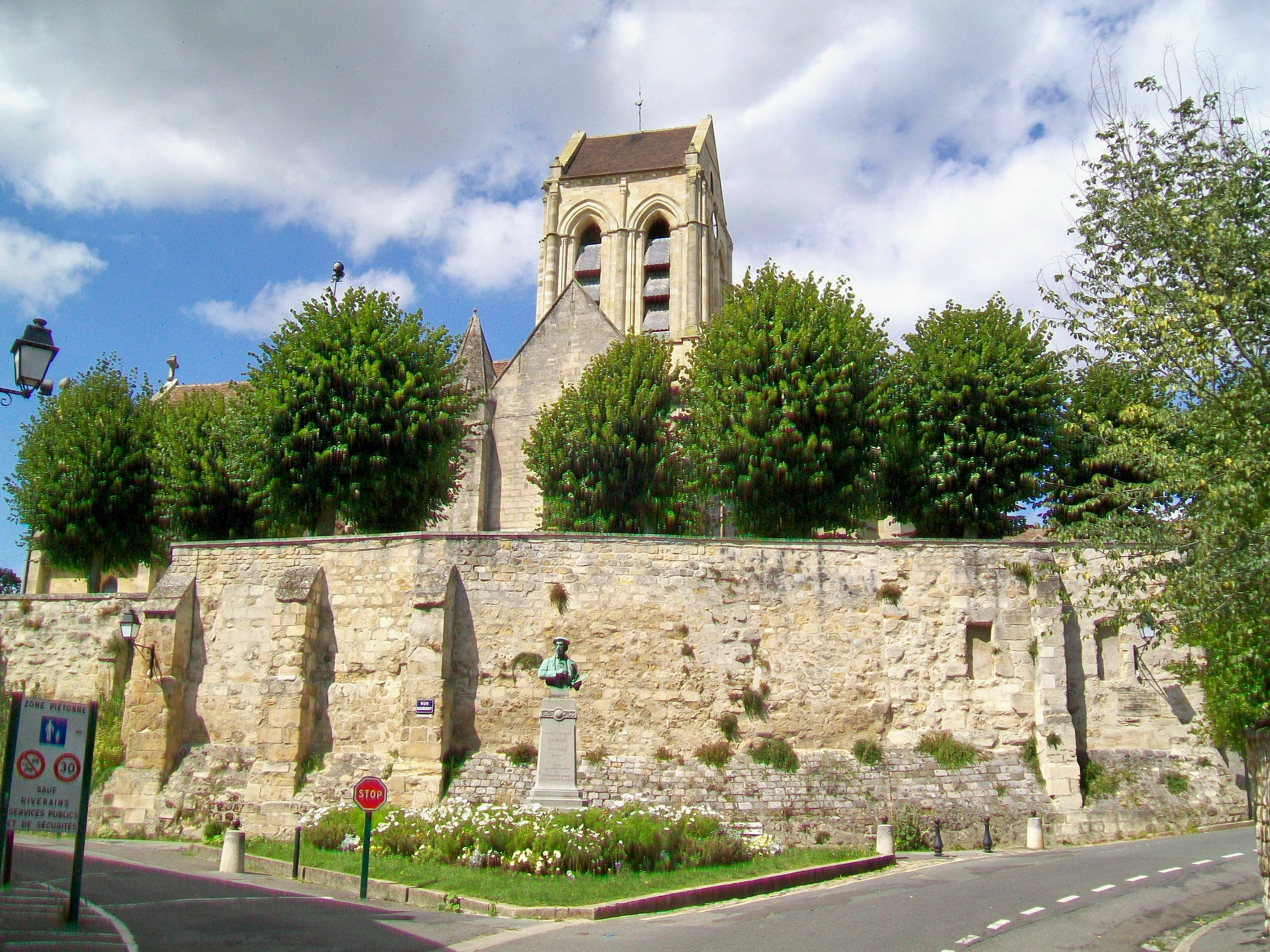
Église Notre-Dame-de-l'Assomption d'Auvers-sur-Oise viewed from a similar angle to that depicted in the painting

== See also ==
- List of works by Vincent van Gogh
