= Houses at Auvers =

Painting by Vincent van Gogh

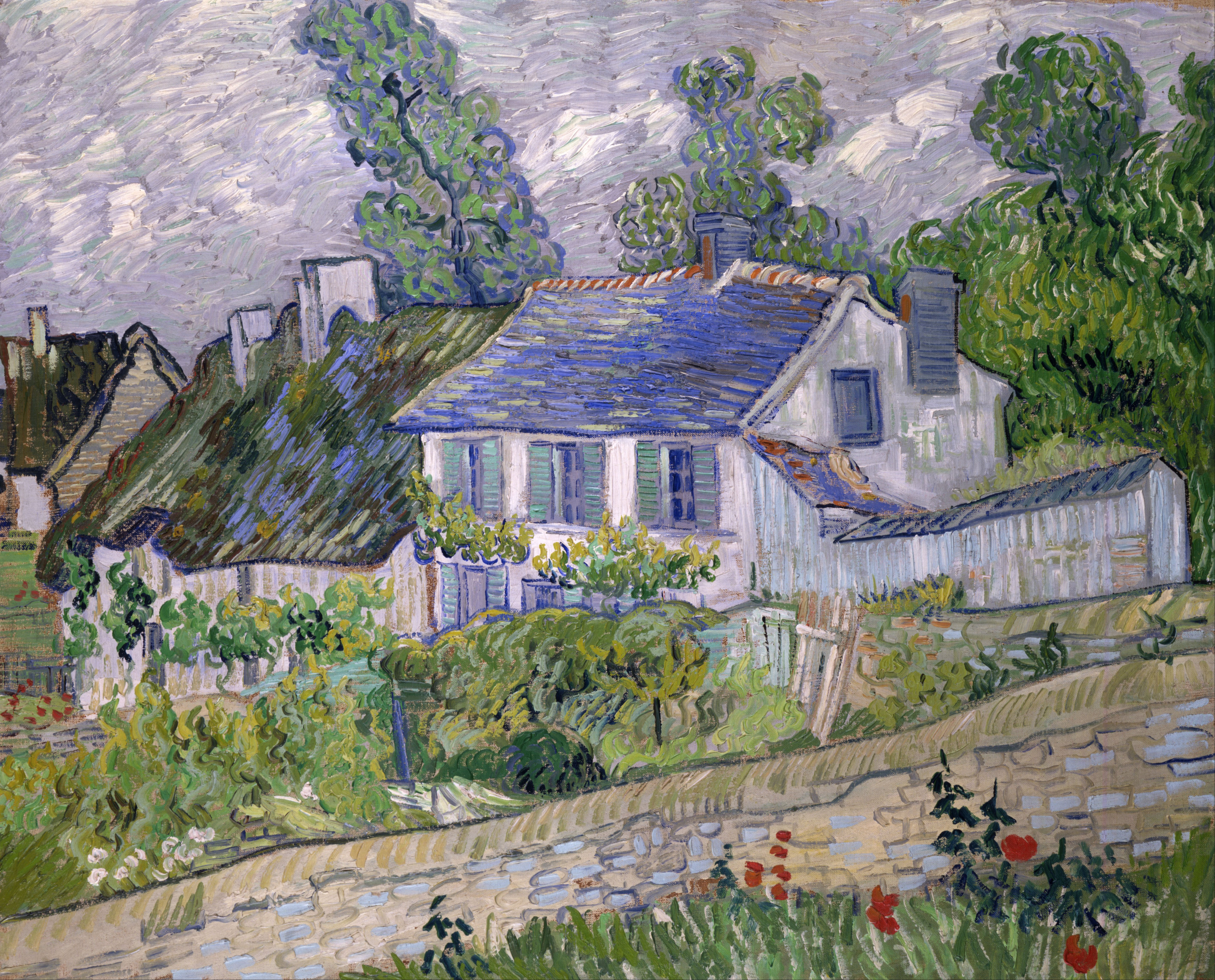
- Artist: Vincent van Gogh
- Year: Auvers-sur-Oise, June 1890
- Catalogue: F759; JH1988
- Medium: Oil on canvas
- Dimensions: 73 cm × 61 cm (19.7 in × 40.6 in)
- Location: Toledo Museum of Art

Houses at Auvers is an oil painting by Vincent van Gogh. It was created towards the end of May or beginning of June 1890, shortly after he had moved to Auvers-sur-Oise, a small town northwest of Paris, France.

His move was prompted by his dissatisfaction with the boredom and monotony of asylum life at Saint-Rémy, as well as by his emergence as an artist of some renown following Albert Aurier's celebrated January 1890, Mercure de France, review of his work.

In his final two months at Saint-Rémy, van Gogh painted from memory a number of canvases he called, "reminisces of the North," harking back to his Dutch roots. The influence of this return to the North continued at Auvers, notably in F789, The Church at Auvers. He did not, however, repeat his studies of peasant life of the sort he had made in his Nuenen period. His paintings of dwellings at Auvers encompassed a range of social domains.

== "Reminisces of the North" ==
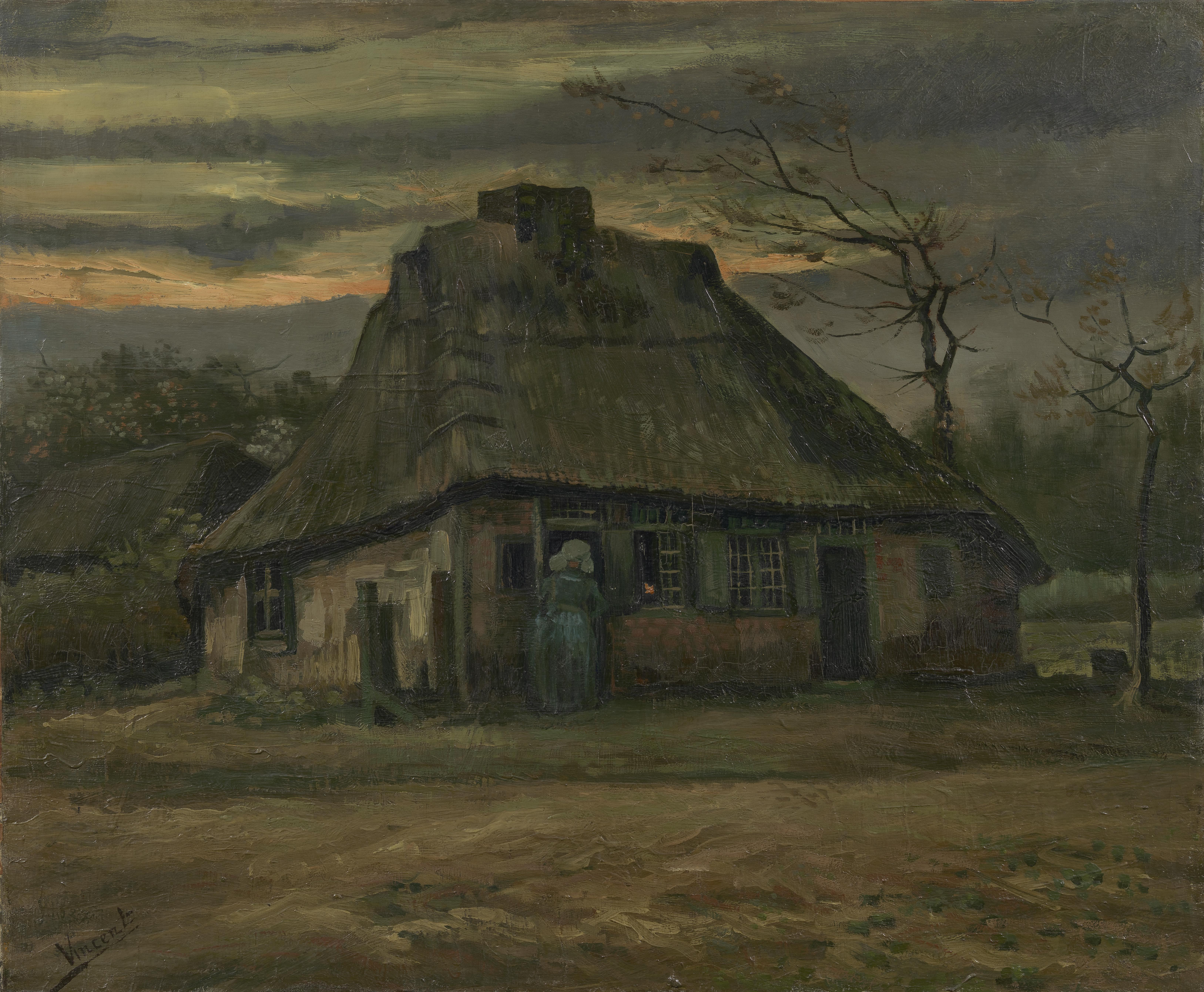
F83: The Cottage, Van Gogh Museum

Vincent van Gogh spent the early 1881–1885 years of his brief ten-year career as an artist painting in the Netherlands at Etten, The Hague, Drenthe, and Nuenen (his last family home). It was in Nuenen that Vincent executed F82, The Potato Eaters, which he considered his first really successful painting, while other early paintings of the time, such as F83, The Cottage (left), attest to his sympathy for peasants and their way of life.

Following the death of his father in March 1885 and ensuing difficulties and quarrels with both his family and neighbours in Nuenen, Van Gogh moved first to Antwerp, Belgium, where he briefly studied at the Academy. Shortly thereafter, he joined his art dealer brother, Theo, in Paris, France, in March 1886. His move from Antwerp was motivated by worries about his health, after he suffered a breakdown earlier in the year.

The two years he spent in Paris with his brother are the least documented of Vincent's career, simply because the main source for Vincent's life are the letters between them and, naturally, they did not correspond when together. (Note: In particular any paintings he might have sold in Paris have gone undocumented as a result. Van Der Veen and Knapp point out that in a sense he sold all his paintings to his art dealer brother Theo, because that is what they contracted together in return for Theo supporting him with what was by the standards of the day a comfortable stipend.) Nevertheless, there are abundant sources to show that Vincent participated fully in the artistic life of the city, although never aligning himself with the Impressionist movement. In particular, he came into contact with Paul Gauguin, whom he idolized. By the end of the two-year period, relations between the brothers had soured somewhat and Vincent resolved to leave Paris and settle in Arles in the south of France, where he conceived the project of starting an artists' commune with Gauguin.

F612: The Starry Night, Museum of Modern Art

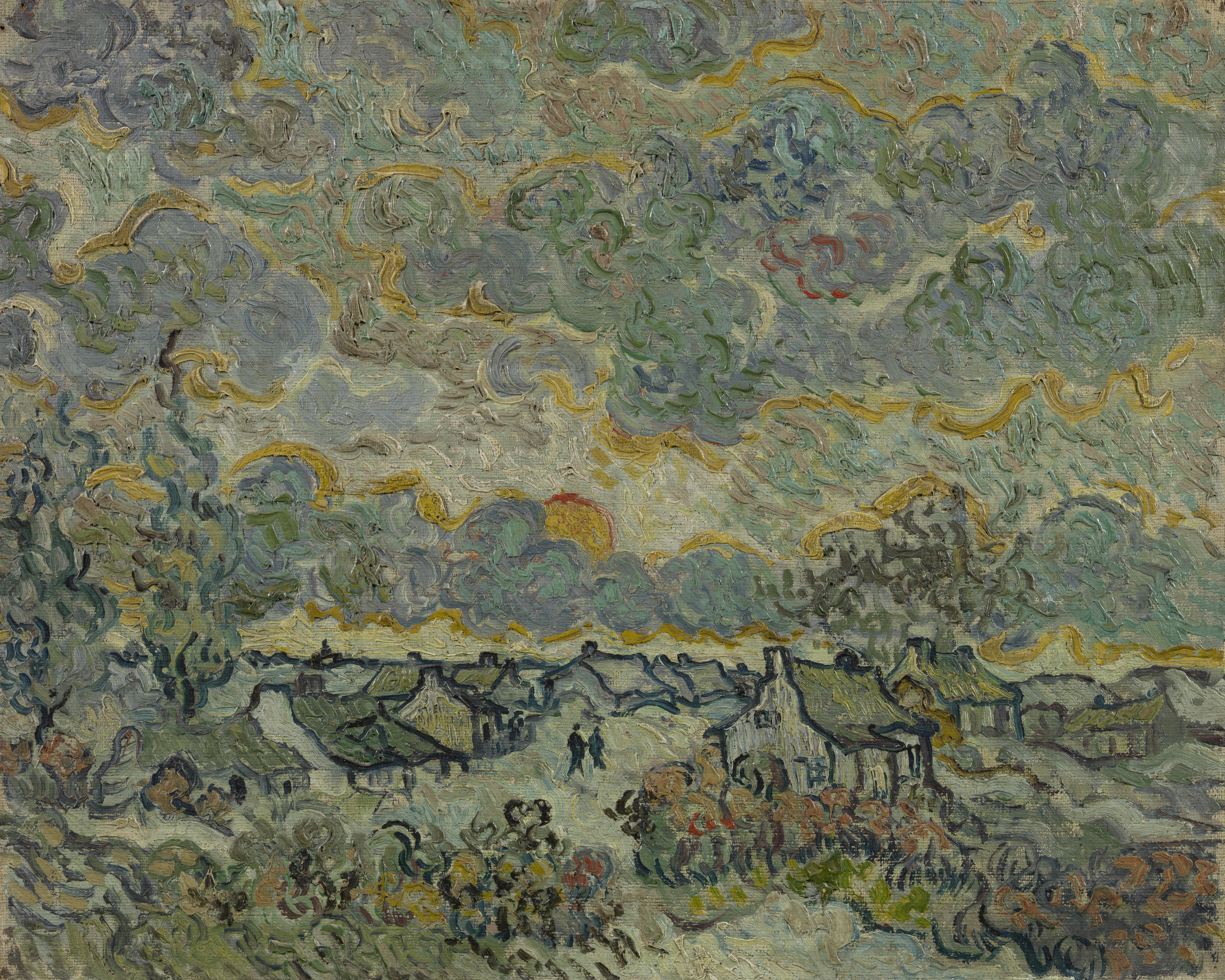
F675: Winter Landscape – Reminiscence of the North, Van Gogh Museum

Gauguin joined Vincent at The Yellow House in October 1888. However, Vincent's erratic behaviour and drunkenness alarmed Gauguin, and by December he had resolved to leave. Vincent suffered a severe nervous collapse as a result and was hospitalised. Despite making a speedy recovery, Vincent voluntarily entered an asylum at Saint-Rémy-de-Provence on 9 May 1889, where he was able to continue painting between relapses of mania (his exact medical condition is not known with certainty). Perhaps his most loved and best known painting, F612 The Starry Night, dates from this time. It exemplifies the vigorous and agitated brush work he had developed.

Vincent suffered his most severe relapse towards the end of February 1890. The following two months he was unable to paint and scarcely able even to write. He declared himself "totally stupefied" in his single letter of this period to Theo on 17 March . Hulsker called it the saddest period of Vincent's life. Nevertheless, Vincent was able to draw and paint a little as he recovered. He described painting a few canvases from memory, which he had experimented with in F496 Memory of the Garden at Etten (Ladies of Arles) while painting with Gauguin, in a letter to Theo dated 29 April. He called these paintings souvenirs du nord, "reminisces of the North." He mentions he might redo F83 The Cottage (above left) and F84 The Old Church Tower at Nuenen.

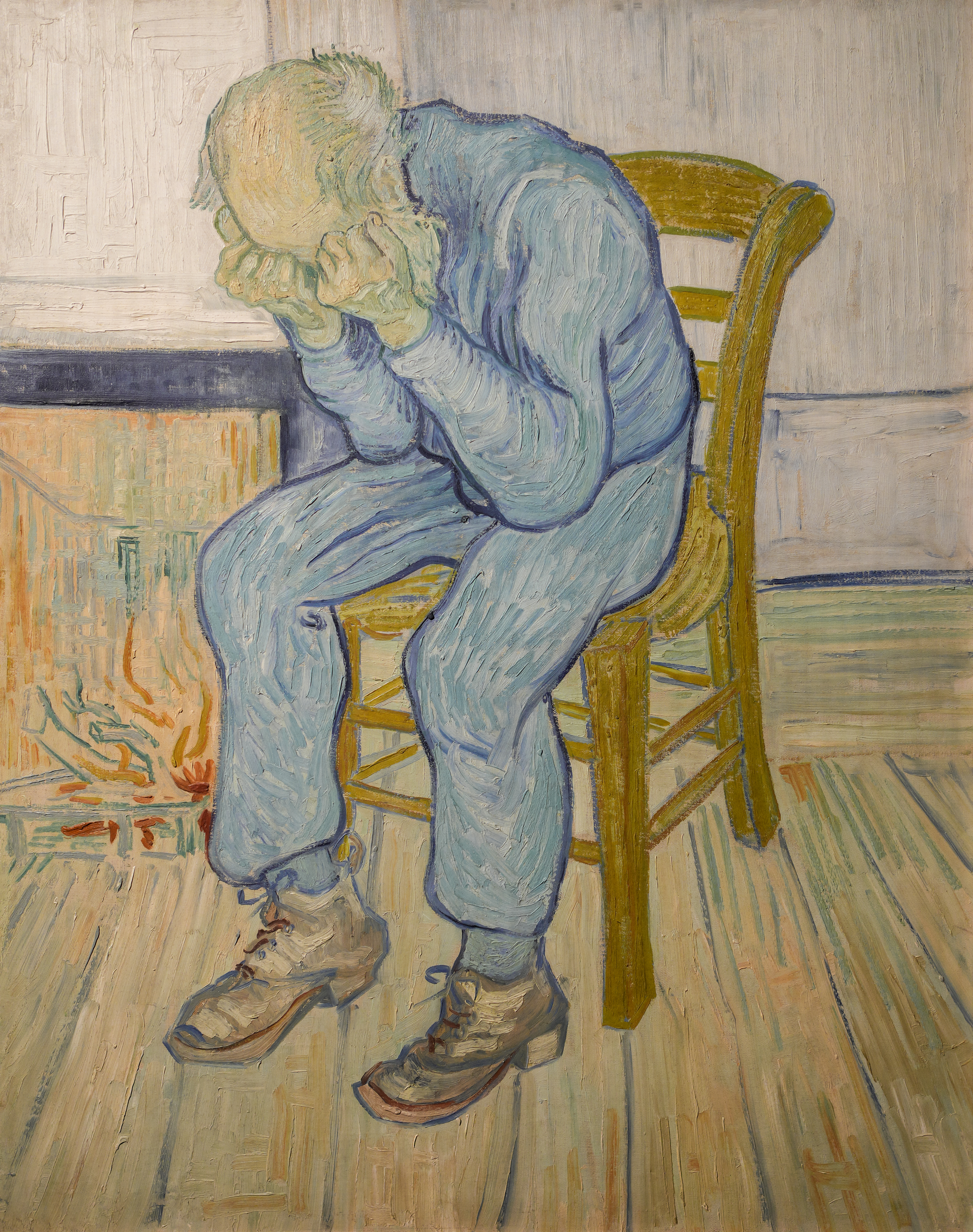
F702: At Eternity's Gate, Kröller-Müller Museum

He is more explicit in a following letter to his mother and sister Willemien: "And while my illness was at its worst, I still painted, among other things a reminiscence of Brabant, cottages with mossy roofs and beech hedges on an autumn evening with a stormy sky, the sun setting red in reddish clouds." This painting is identified by the Van Gogh Museum as either F673, F674, or F675 (right). Hulsker also singles out F695 Two Peasant Women Digging in the Snow and identifies a series of sketches depicting peasants, of which F1594r is an example, as dating from this time as well. He says these works, almost alone in Vincent's entire oeuvre, show unmistakable signs of mental collapse. Finally he notes that F702: Worn Out – At Eternity's Gate, which Vincent made at this time, is likewise an unmistakable remembrance of times long past. The original was a drawing Vincent had made in The Hague.

Vincent ascribed this latest relapse to the boredom and monotony of life at the asylum. For months, he had been writing to Theo saying he wanted to leave the asylum. He felt sure that if he moved back to Paris he would get well quickly. At the same time Vincent had become something of a celebrity in the art world following a very favourable review of his work by the critic Albert Aurier, who declared him a genius. Despite his misgivings, Theo followed advice proffered by Camille Pissarro and arranged for Vincent to work at the village of Auvers-sur-Oise north of Paris under the supervision of Paul Ferdinand Gachet, a doctor.

== Auvers ==
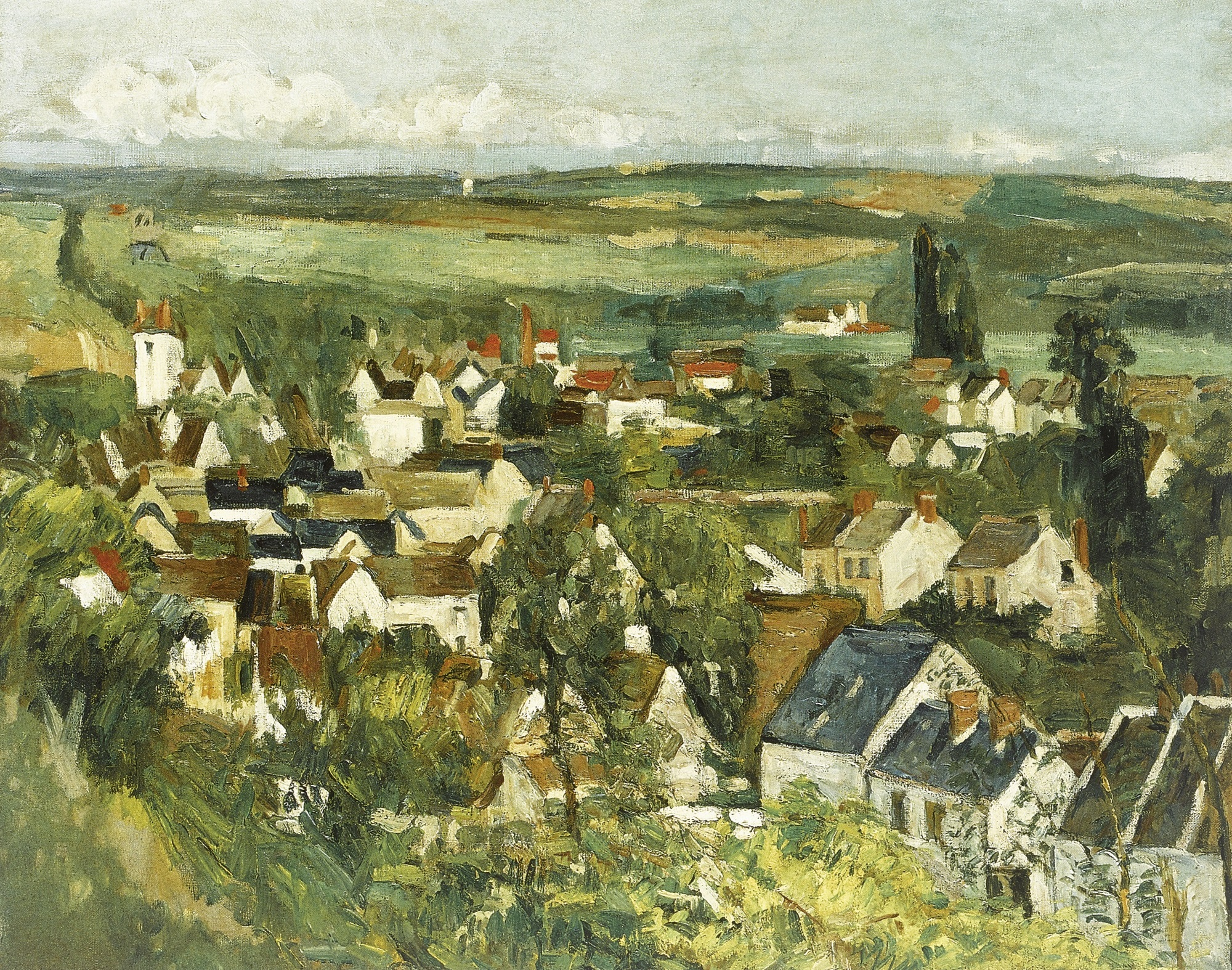
Paul Cézanne, Panoramic view of Auvers, Art Institute of Chicago

Auvers-sur-Oise was a medieval town about 15 miles northwest of the centre of Paris. It was only a few roads wide, but extended for miles along the river in both directions, vineyards and market gardens scattered all along its length. Its hamlets were a mix of clusters of thatched houses and farm enclosures. The French painter Charles-François Daubigny first moored his studio barge Botin there in the 1850s, and later purchased no less than three houses in the village as well as another nearby. With the advent of a railway, the town became a tourist centre, its population swelling from 2,000 to 3,000 in the summer months. It attracted artists such as Corot, Cezanne and Pissarro, all seeking to capture its rustic charms. Dealers like Theo van Gogh sold thousands of their images.

Auvers had consequently become a prosperous community. It was a model of Third Republic idealism regarding the modernization of the peasants:

Auvers farmers worked their own land. Tenant farmers were rare, and most landowners employed day labourers only in the harvest season. The property was parcelled and passed on through inheritance or through private sales ... Steady, landed and industrious, wearing both peasant denim and the latest city styles, the Auvers farmers were, to vary Eugen Weber's phrase, "peasants become Frenchmen," ...

— Carol Zemel, Van Gogh's Progress: Utopia, Modernity, and Late-Nineteenth-Century Art

Van Gogh was alert to the change and the new modernity. Writing to Theo and Jo on 25 May, he remarked:

Here we’re far enough from Paris for it to be the real countryside, but nevertheless, how changed since Daubigny. But not changed in an unpleasant way, there are many villas and various modern and middle-class dwellings, very jolly, sunny and covered with flowers. That is the almost lush countryside, just at this moment of the development of a new society in the old one, has nothing disagreeable about it; there’s a lot of well-being in the air. I see or think I see a calm there à la Puvis de Chavannes, no factories, but beautiful greenery in abundance and in good order.

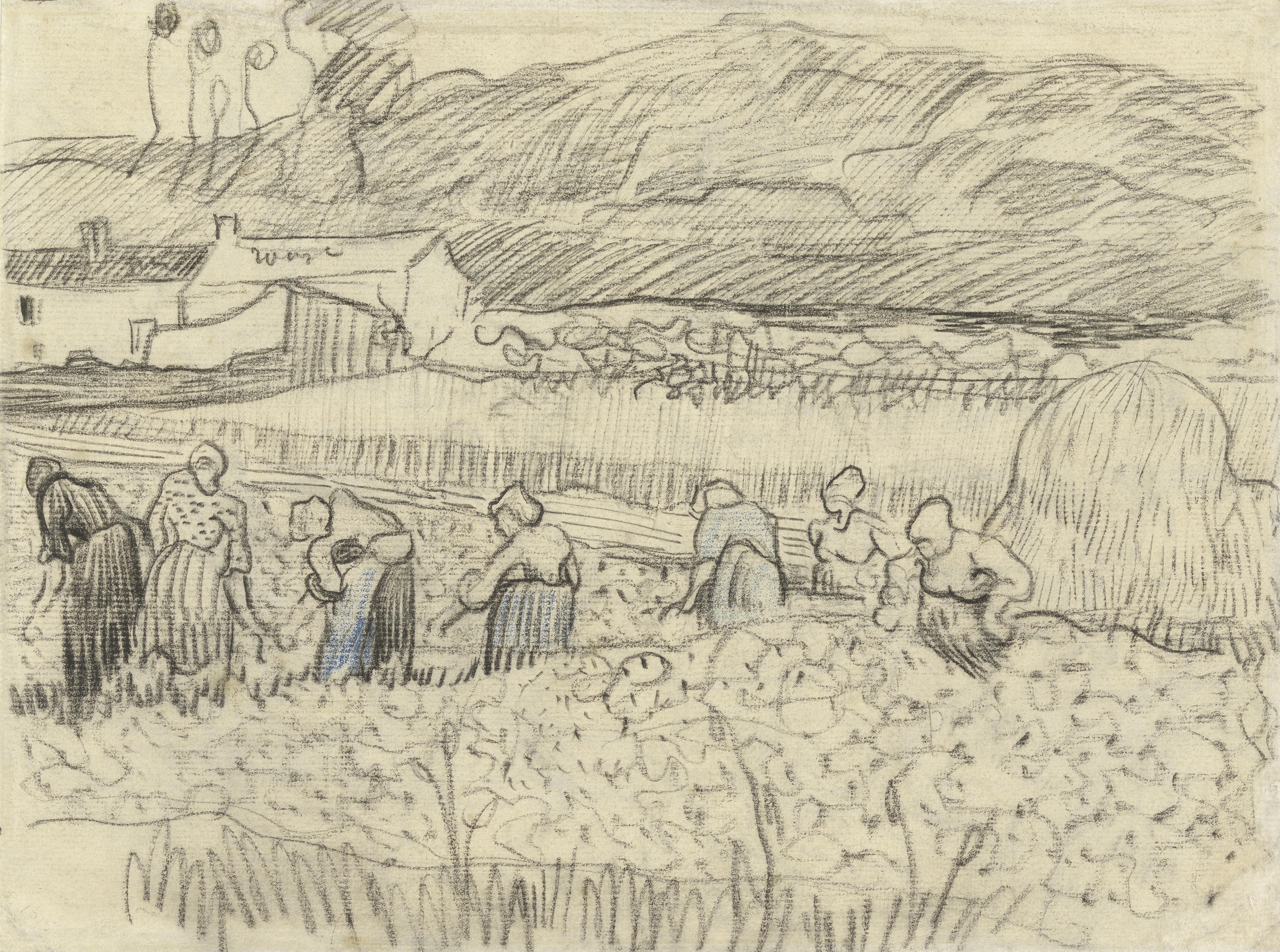
F1615v: Landscape with Peasant Women Harvesting, Van Gogh Museum.

Van Gogh made no paintings of traditional peasant life, la vie rustique, at Auvers of the sort he had formerly made in Nuenen. His sketchbooks contain perhaps just half a dozen or so quick studies of peasant scenes, such as F1615v Landscape with Peasant Women Harvesting (right), as well as a rather larger number of studies of farm animals such as chickens and ponies. His subjects were landscapes, townscapes, portraiture, and still lifes. His paintings at Auvers imply a range of social domains. Thus, his paintings of dwellings range from thatched cottages through to middle-class villas and finally aristocratic châteaus, and these are set within the social spaces of gardens, streets, and the vestiges of feudal domain respectively.

During the months of May, June and July 1890, van Gogh was extremely productive. The letters give accounts of thirty-six paintings that can be dated with certainty to the Auvers period. The 1970 catalogue raisonné lists another fifty or so, of which some may date before Auvers and others may be inauthentic. Even certain paintings imply a painting executed every other day over the two-month period.

The village captivated him. On his arrival on 20 May 1890, he wrote to his brother Theo and wife Jo Bonger that "Auvers is really beautiful – among other things many old thatched roofs, which are becoming rare." In his letter the following day he adds, "But I find the modern villas and the middle-class country houses almost as pretty as the old thatched cottages that are falling into ruin."

Van Gogh lodged at the Auberge Ravoux, where he remained until his death in the early hours of the morning of 29 July 1890 from a self-inflicted gunshot wound to the stomach.

== Description ==
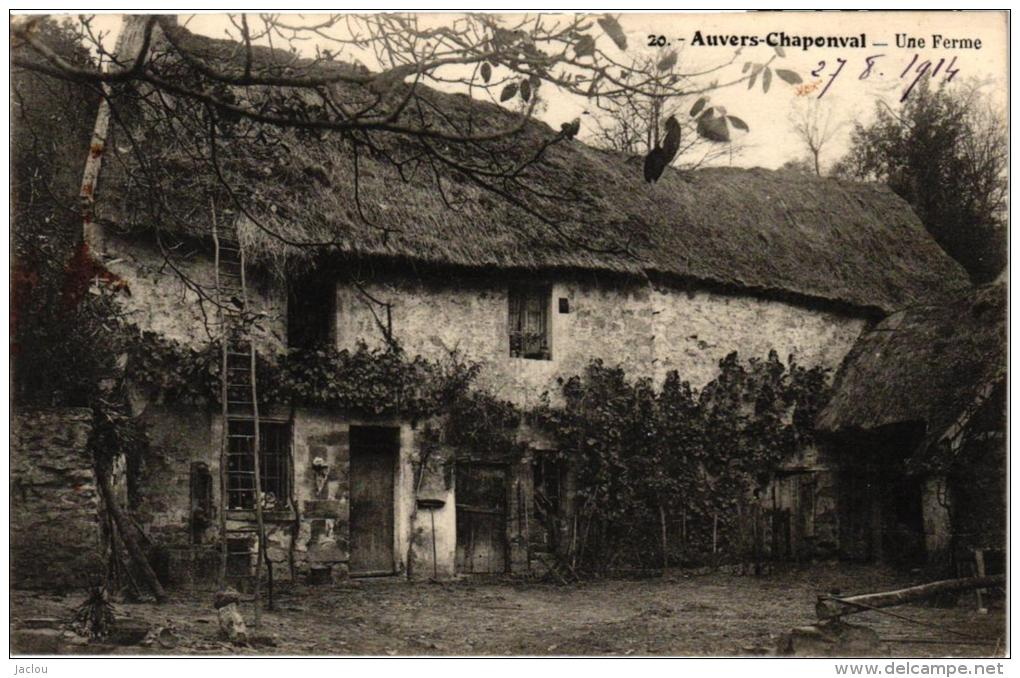
A postcard showing a farmhouse in Chaponval before 1914.

The central house was a townhouse in the hamlet of Chaponval, about a mile west of the Auberge Ravoux. It was situated at 5 Rue de Gré (49°4′16.02″N 2°8′48.94″E) and still exists, although renovated. It belonged to a mason named August Lecroix and was the subject of an earlier 1873 painting by Paul Cézanne titled La maison du Père Lacroix. Hulsker thought Houses at Auvers was painted shortly after van Gogh arrived. De La Faille thought it painted a little later at the beginning of June, citing a letter of 10 June 1890.

The two thatched cottages at the left are set at right angles. They reappear in F780 Thatched cottages in Auvers (see below).

Van Gogh was generally meticulous in his depiction of street scenes, a fact that allowed the precise location of the F766 White House at Night to be ascertained, an Auvers painting that was once thought lost but re-emerged in 1995 in the collection of the Hermitage Museum.

Toledo Museum of Art, the holding museum, points to the structural juxtaposition of the blue-tiled roof and the adjacent thatched roof of the house. Vigorous brush strokes, varying in direction, are used to highlight the contrast and textures. By contrast, the trees and garden are represented in the characteristic swirling manner van Gogh developed at Saint-Rémy. Pickvance notes the colour scheme is restrained in accordance with van Gogh's return to the North, but also in response to the weather conditions: the sky is laden with clouds and a poplar tree bends to the force of the wind. The paint is applied remarkably thinly in places, and there are bare patches of canvas. Van Der Veen & Knapp remark that at the time of writing (2010), the shutters still retained their original green colour.

== Related work ==
=== Thatched cottages ===
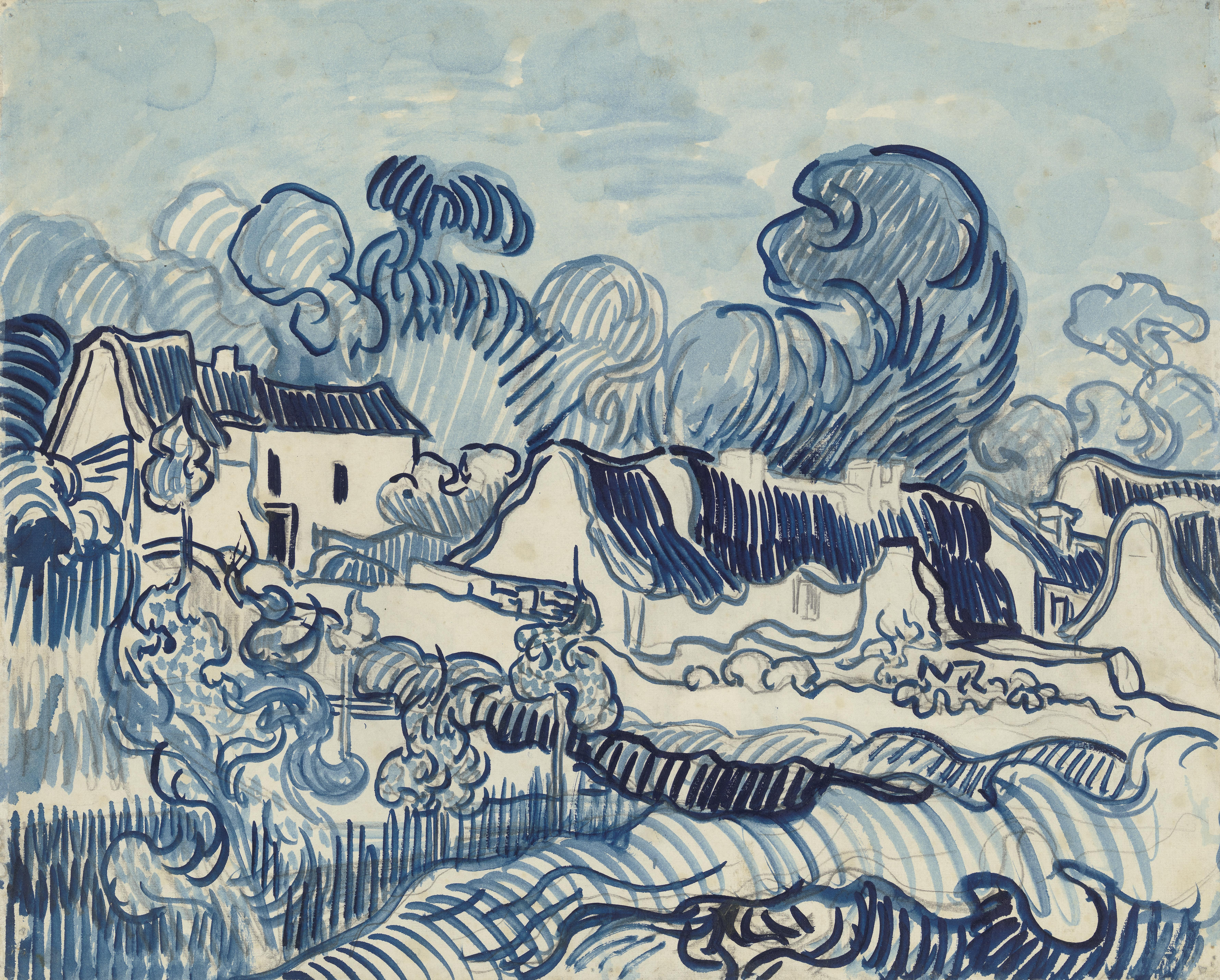
F1640r: Landscape with Houses, Van Gogh Museum

The picturesque thatched cottages of Auvers appear of necessity in many of van Gogh's views of the town. Only in four paintings are thatched cottages the dominant theme: F758, F780, F792, and F806. In drawings such as F1640r (right), the exaggerated rounded roof lines are not to be found in either French or Dutch cottages. They are part of van Gogh's return to the North he describes in a letter to Theo dated 29 April 1890. The drawing is a study for F750 (below). Close examination shows that there are nevertheless significant differences between the two works; for example, the hills in the painting are trees in the drawing. Van Der Veen & Knapp comment that these liberties van Gogh took with his subject matter demonstrate that his paintings and drawings are not literal depictions of nature but rather interpretations of it.

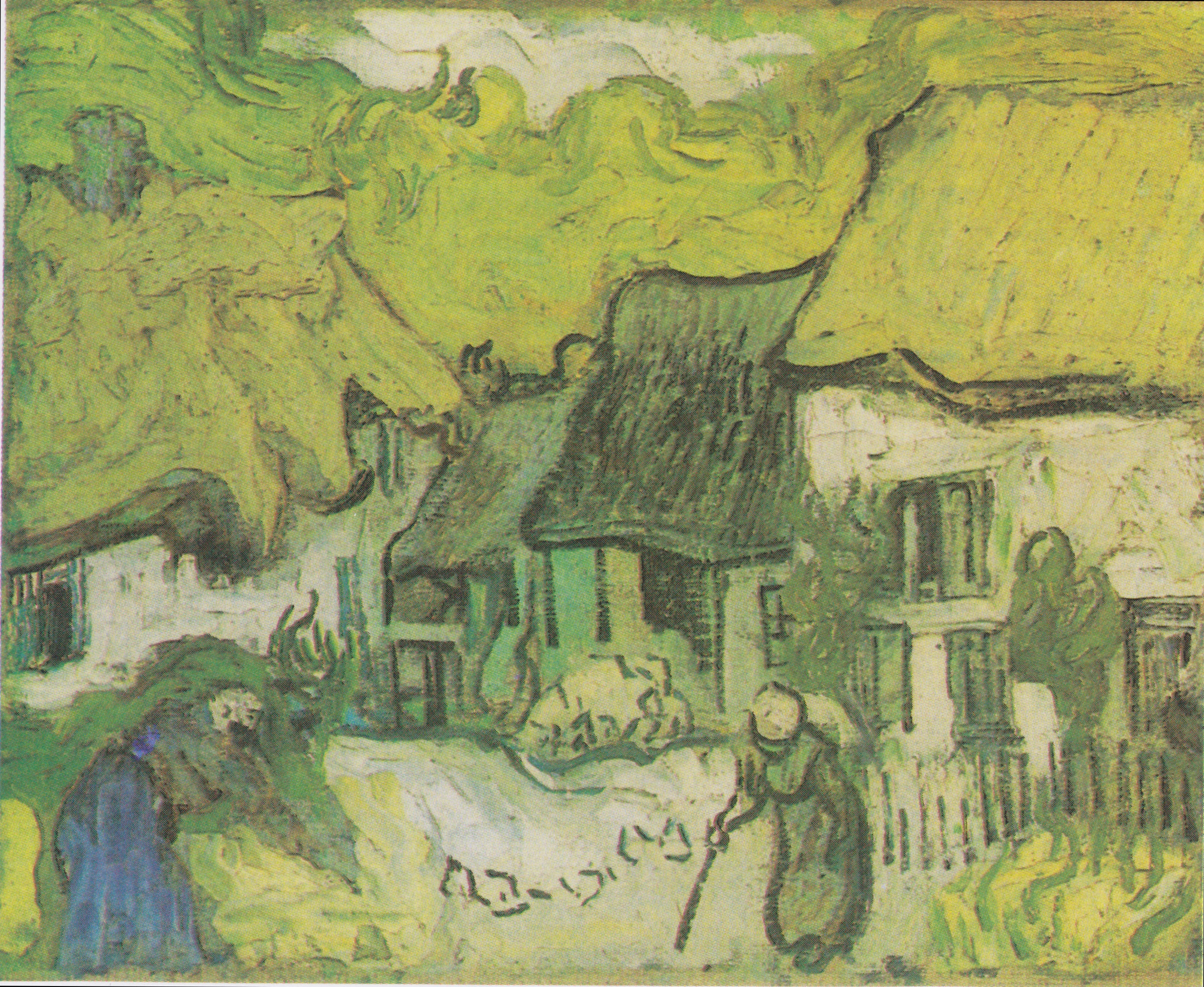
F758: Farmhouses in Jorgus with figures, Private collection

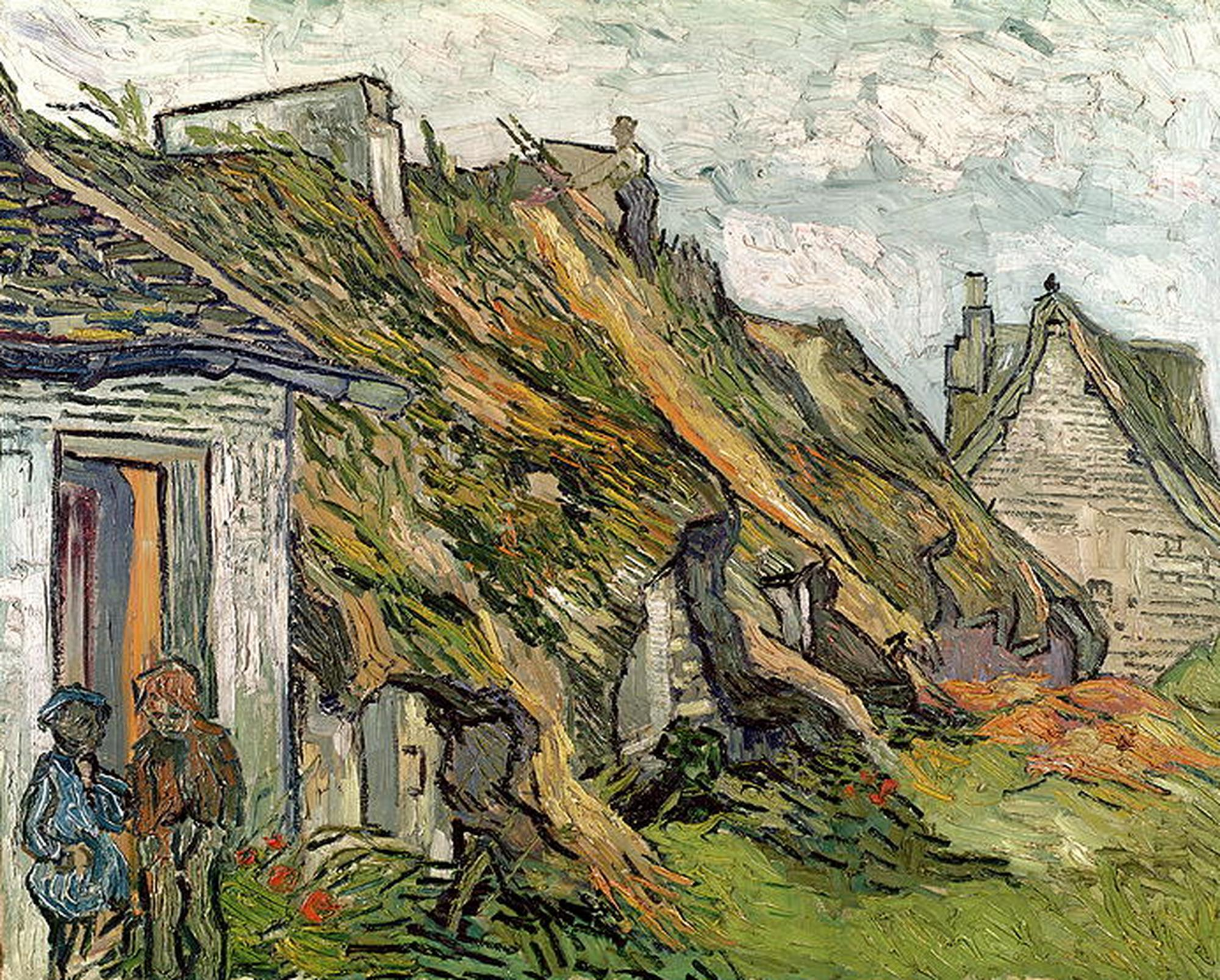
F780: Thatched Cottages in Auvers, Kunsthaus Zürich

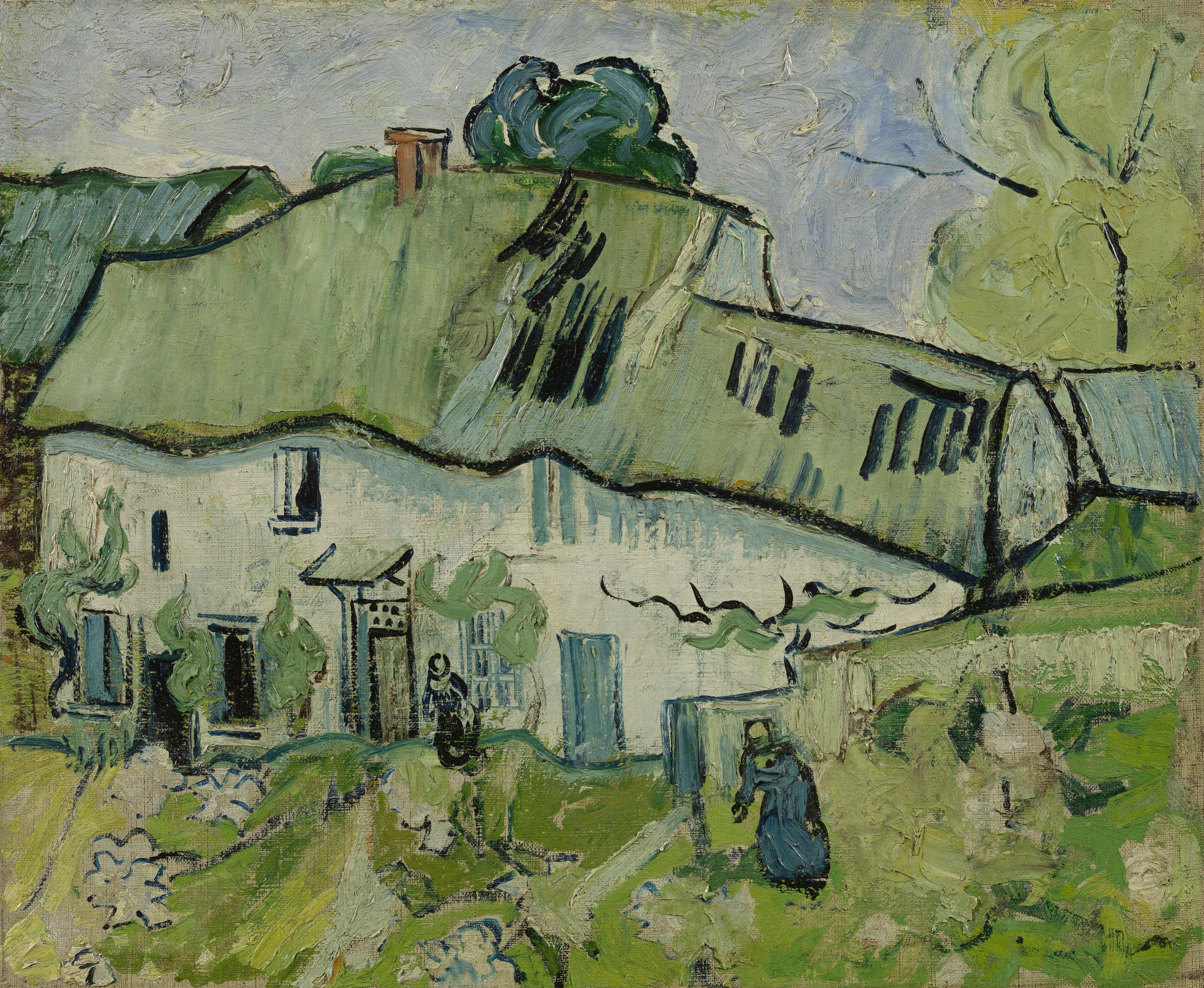
F806: Farmhouse with two figures, Van Gogh Museum

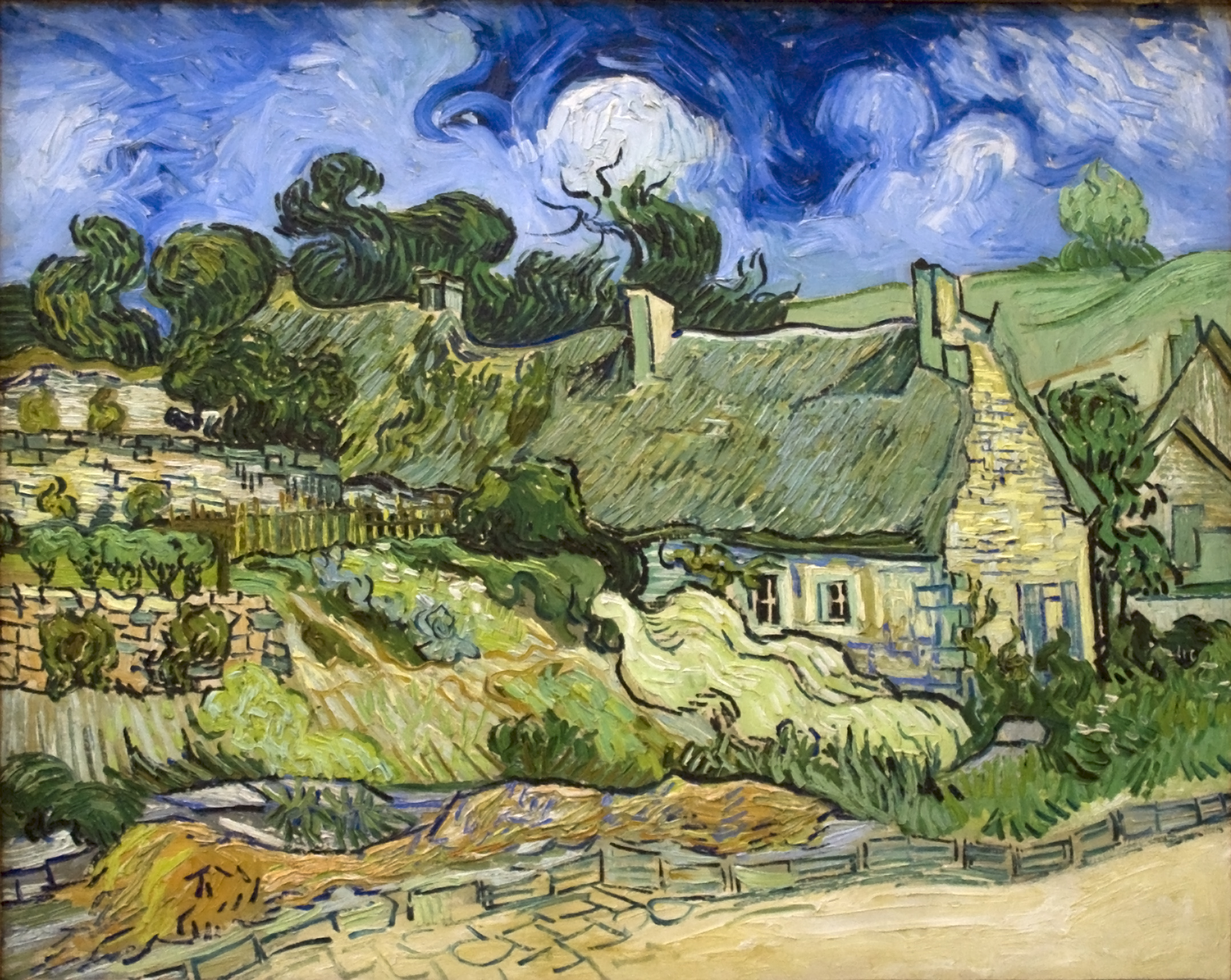
F792: Thatched Cottages at Cordeville, Musée d'Orsay
- On Sunday 8 June, Theo and Jo (with their then-infant son, Vincent Willem) visited Vincent and they all had dinner together at Dr. Gachet's. The following Tuesday, 10 June, van Gogh wrote to say he had since completed two more studies in "the greenery" (i.e. the suburbs). Hulsker thought these were most likely F758 Farmhouses in Jorgus with figures and F806 Farmhouse with two figures. Van Der Veen & Knapp describe F758 as extremely crude, a reminder that not everything from a master is masterful, nevertheless pointing out the masterly economy of the figure on the right and the line of chickens to her left. By contrast the figure on the left is quite unfinished. Similarly F806 is unfinished in parts, especially at the lower right where there is bare canvas. The brushwork is indistinct and the sky lacks definition.

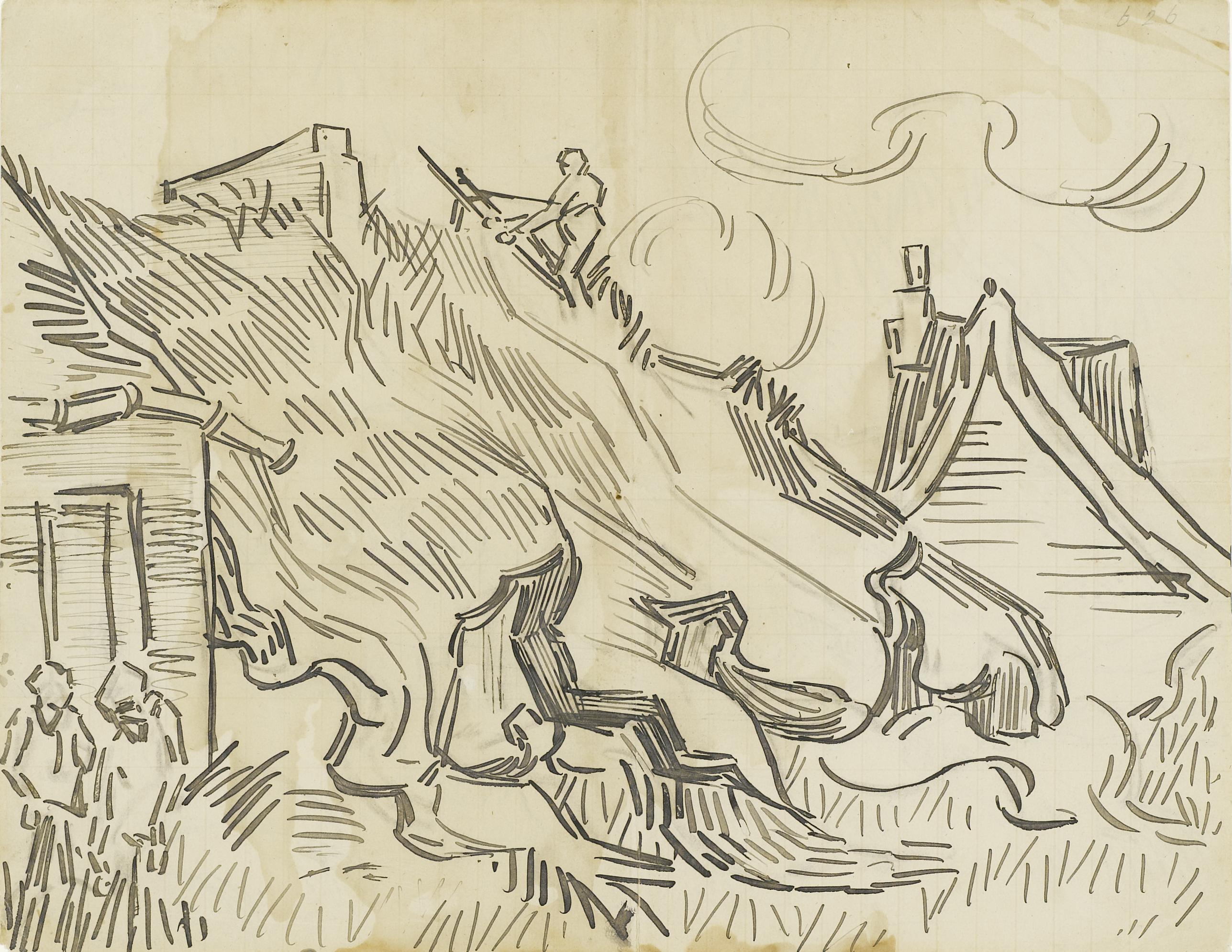
JH2116: Sketch C Letter 902

- F780 Thatched Cottages in Auvers depicts the thatch on a cottage being renewed. The location is the same one in Chaponval as F759 Houses in Auvers (i.e. the subject of this article), featuring the same house with a pointed roof and distinctive chimney (the leftmost house in F758 is the rightmost house in F780 seen at right angles). However, whereas F759 was painted shortly after van Gogh arrived in Auvers, F780 would seem to have been amongst the last of van Gogh's paintings, as he encloses a sketch of it (right) in his last letter to Theo of 23 July. (Note: A draft of this letter was found on van Gogh's body, but it did not differ significantly from the one Theo actually received. Nevertheless the 23 July letter was sufficiently out of character for Theo and Jo to correspond about it (Jo was in Amsterdam at the time). Hulsker says of Vicent's last letters that they are not exactly cheerful (he was beset with worries about Theo's health and future), but that they were not suicidal. Indeed, the 23 July letter included a request for fresh paints.) Both Hulsker and De La Faille date it July 1890. Both Pickvance and Van Der Veen & Knapp note that it is compositionally similar to F420 Row of Cottages at Saintes Maries painted some two years earlier on a day trip from the asylum at Saint-Rémy.
- Van Der Veen and Knapp describe F792 Thatched Cottages at Cordeville as characteristic of the village views van Gogh made at this time. The colours are subdued and no use of complementary colours is made. The location is quite likely 18 Rue Rajon (49°4′27.80″N 2°11′11.09″E). Hulsker places it amongst the earliest of the Auvers paintings. De La Faille notes similarities of location with drawing F1637r.

=== Views of Auvers ===
Other paintings from this period are: F750 Thatched Cottages and Houses (for which F1640r above right is a study), F789 The Church at Auvers (another example of his return to the North), the size 30 canvases, and the double-square paintings. F793 Farms near Auvers is an example of a double-square canvas.

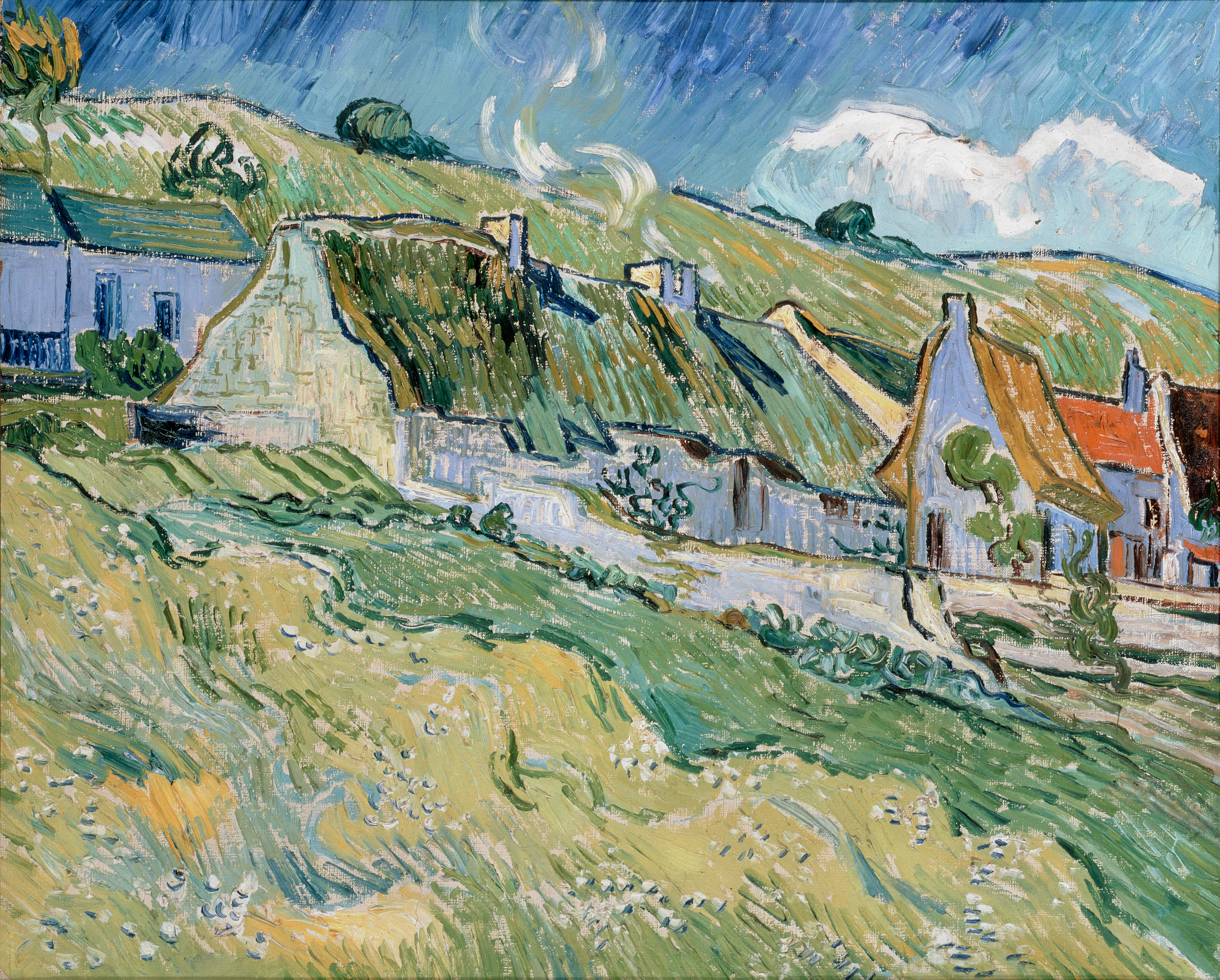
F750: Thatched Cottages and Houses, The Hermitage

F766: White House at Night, The Hermitage

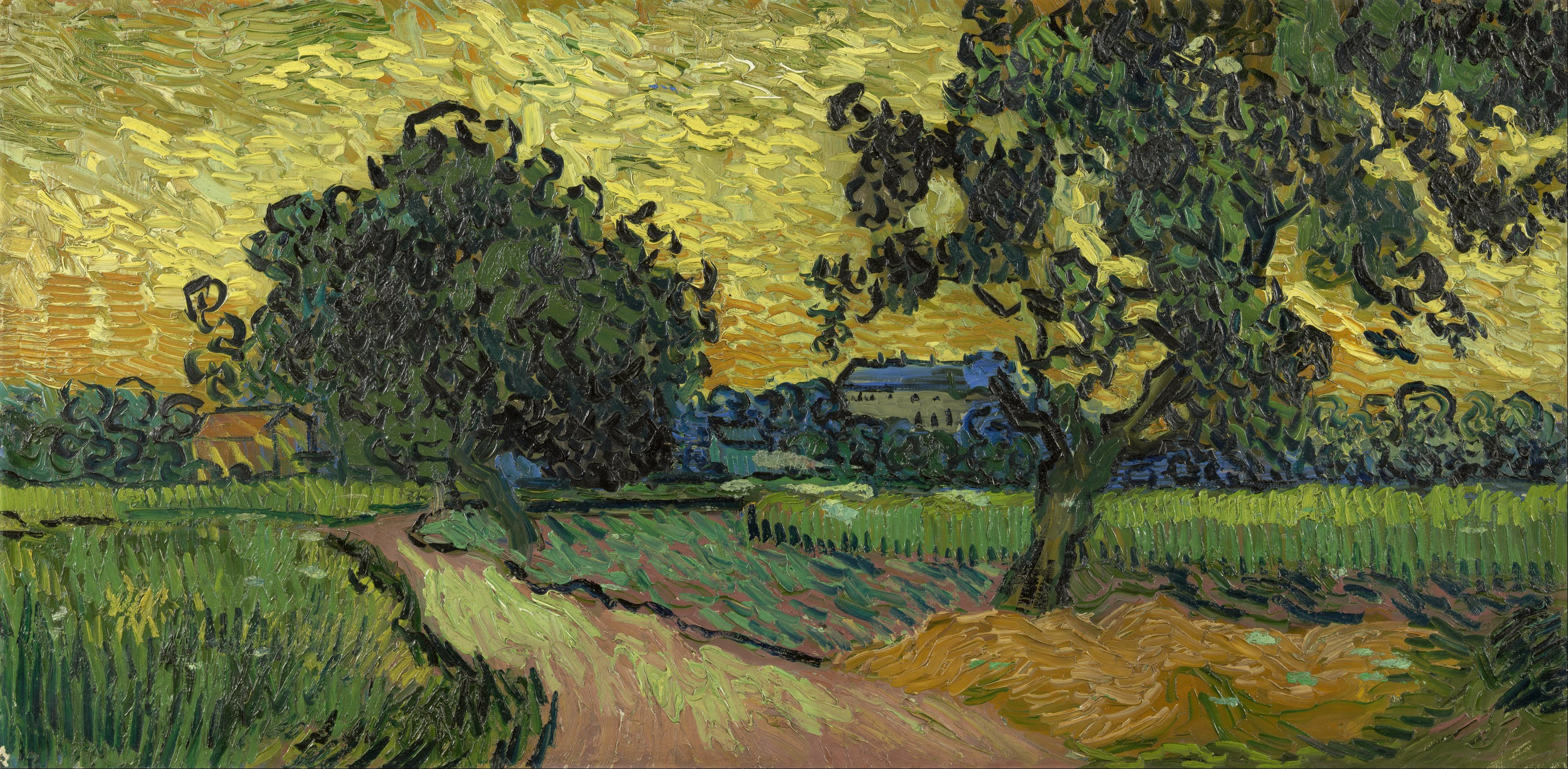
F770: Landscape at Twilight, Van Gogh Museum

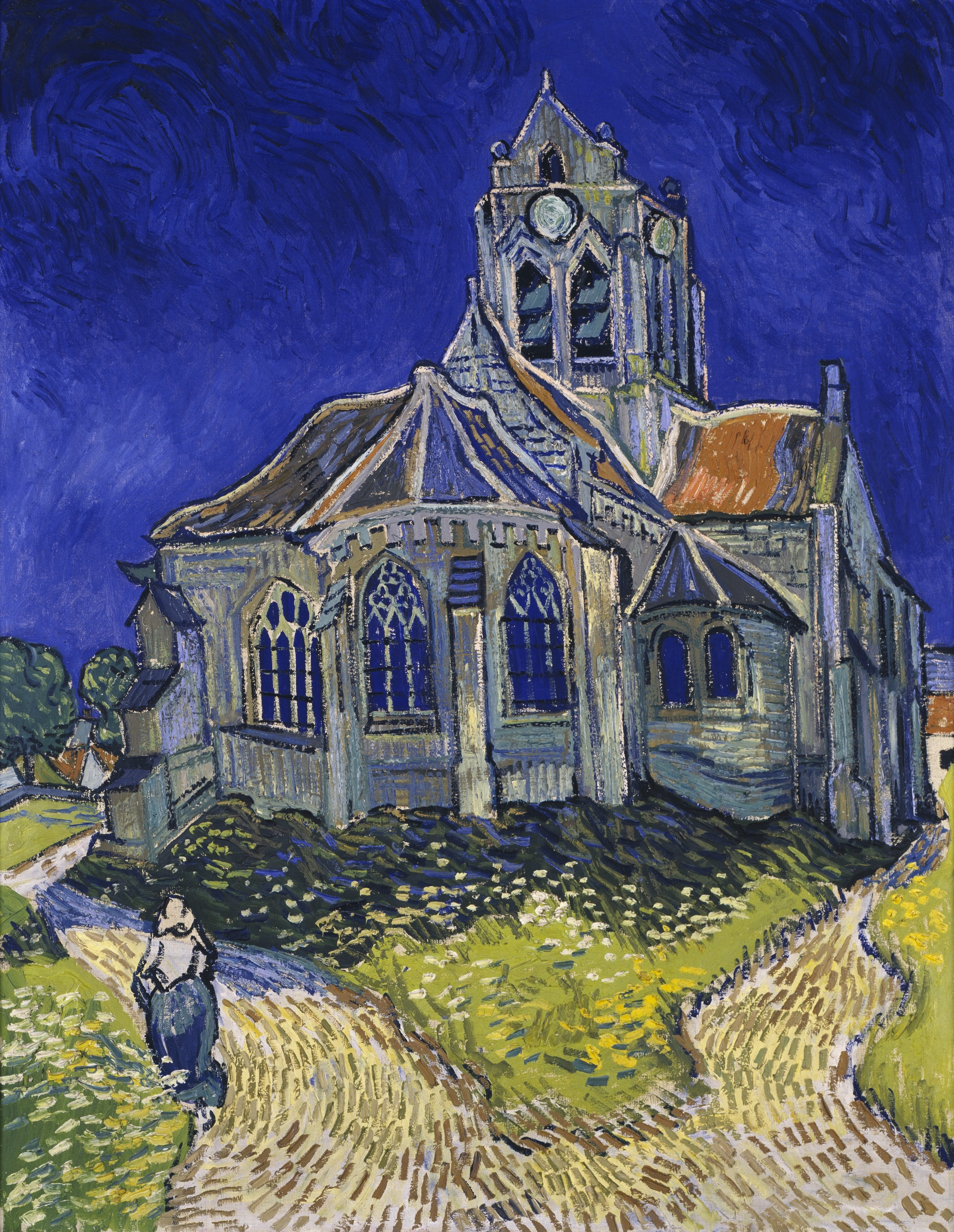
F789: The Church at Auvers, Musée d'Orsay

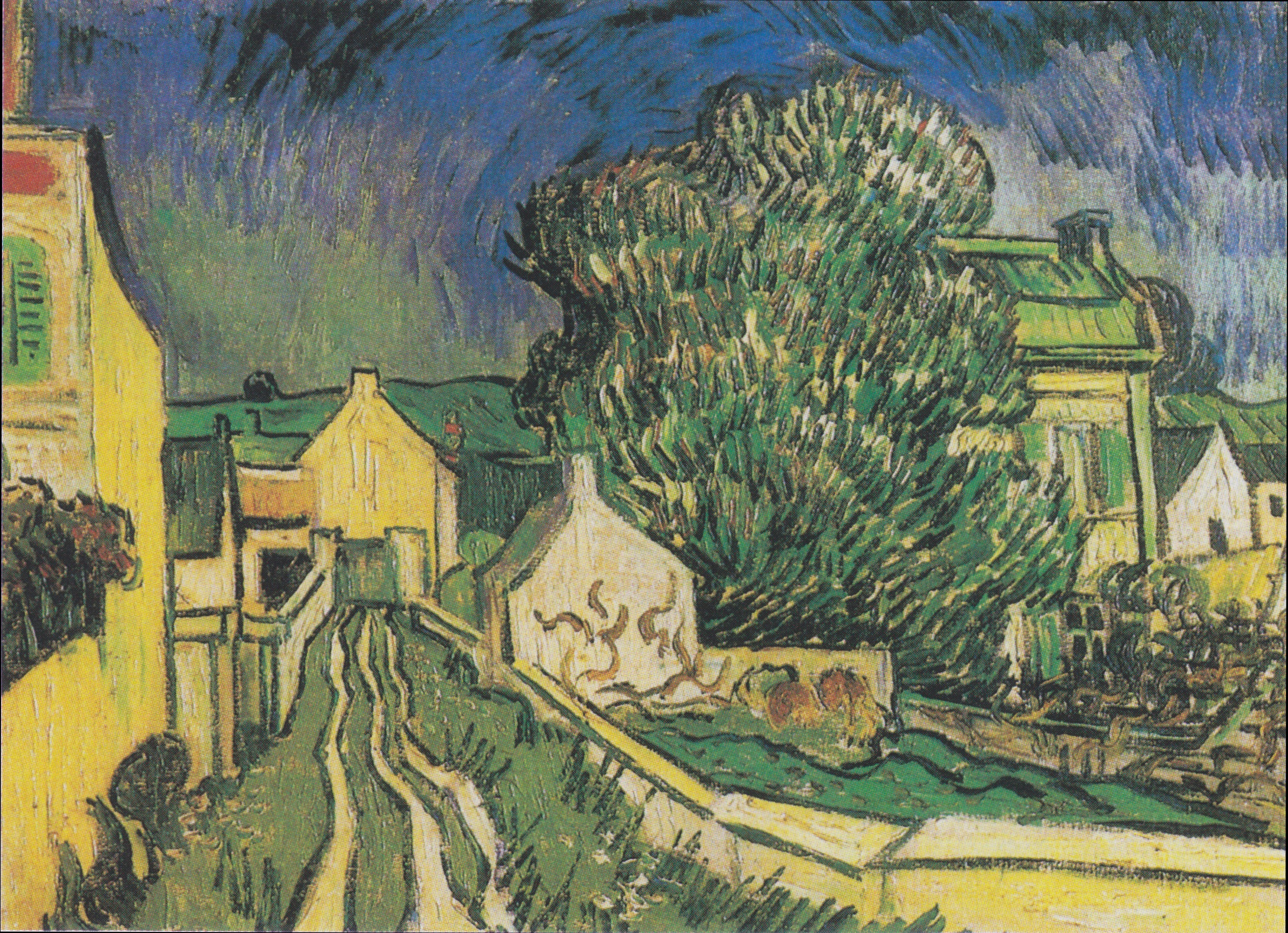
F791: The House of Père Pilon, Private collection

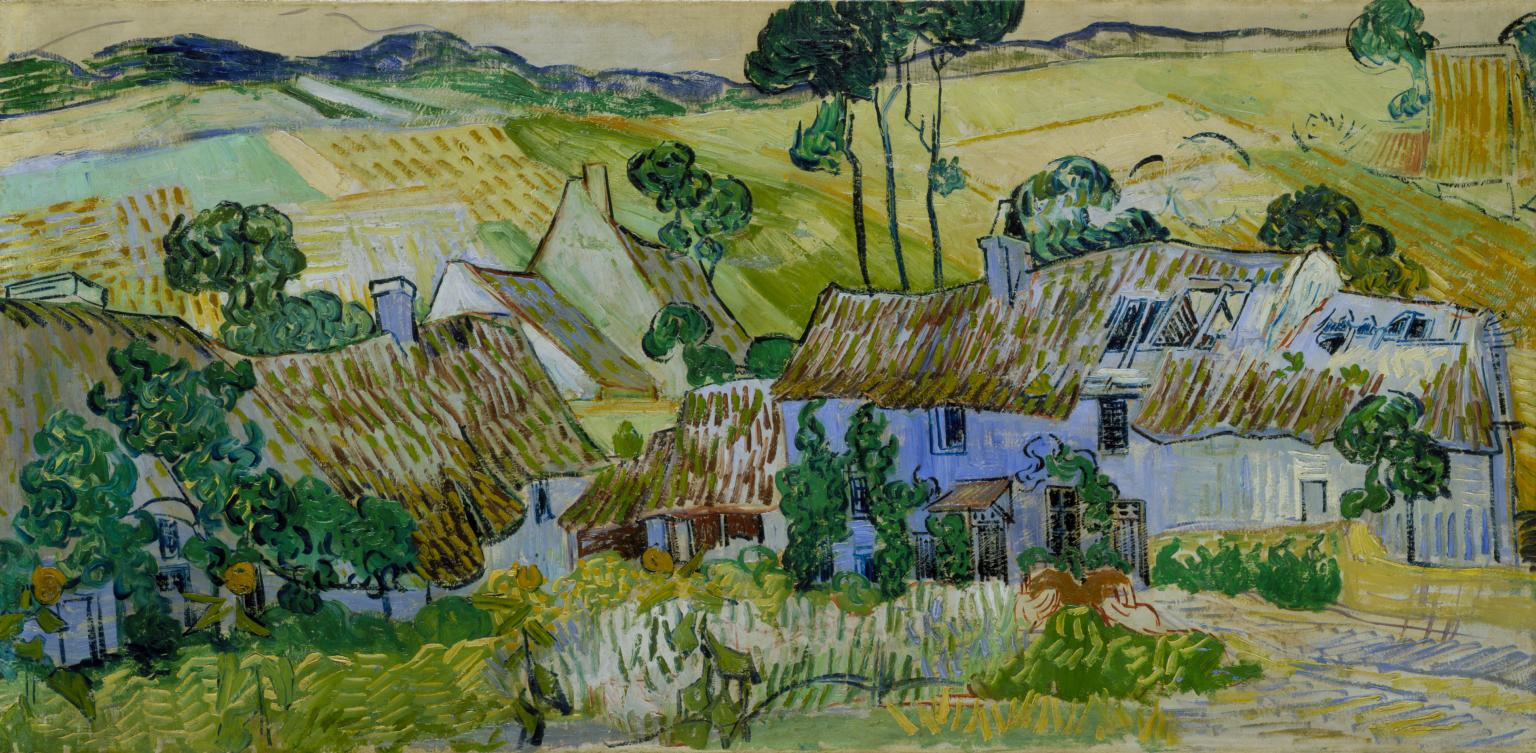
F793: Farms near Auvers, Tate

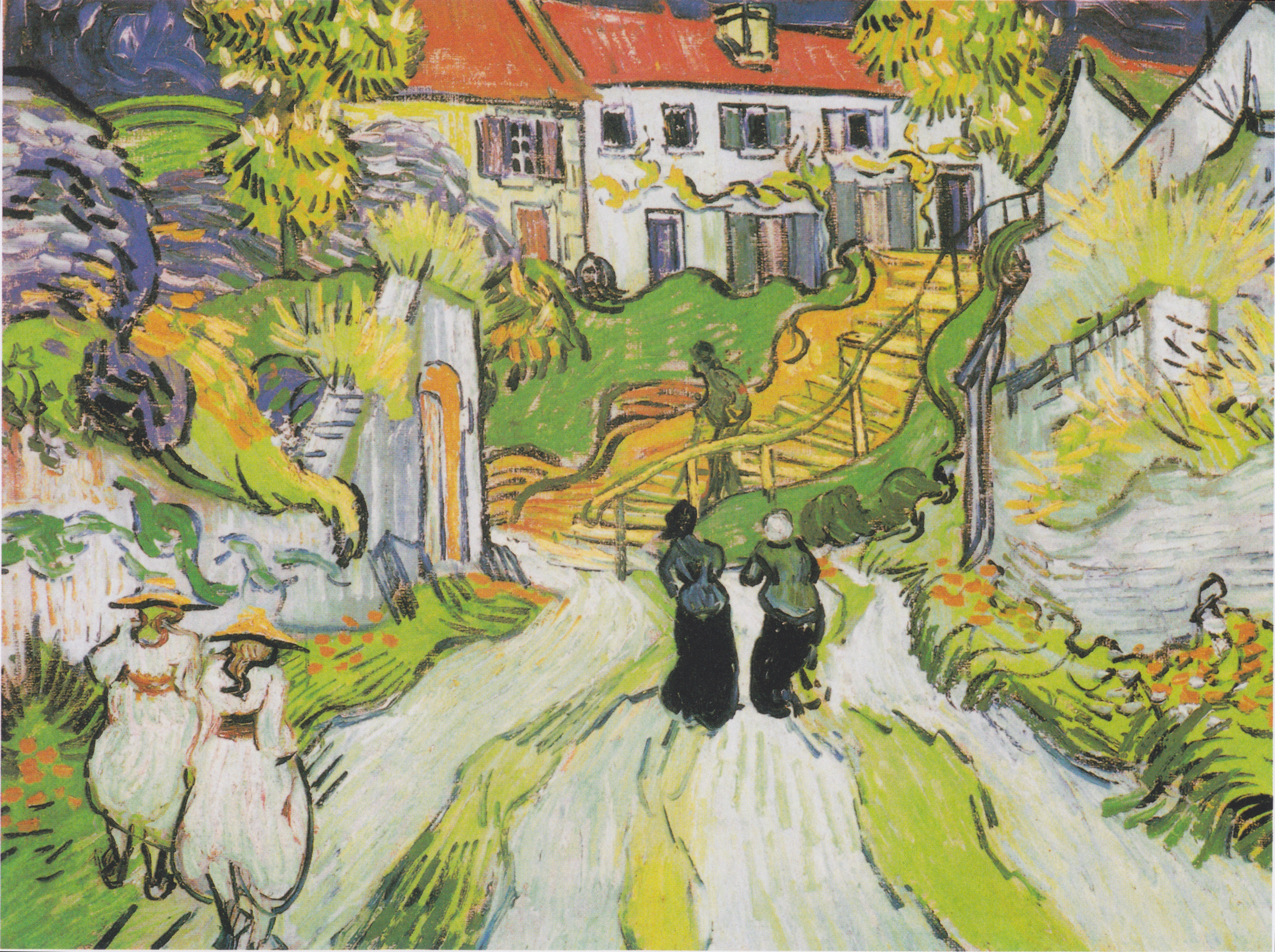
F795: Village street and stairs in Auvers with figures, Saint Louis Art Museum

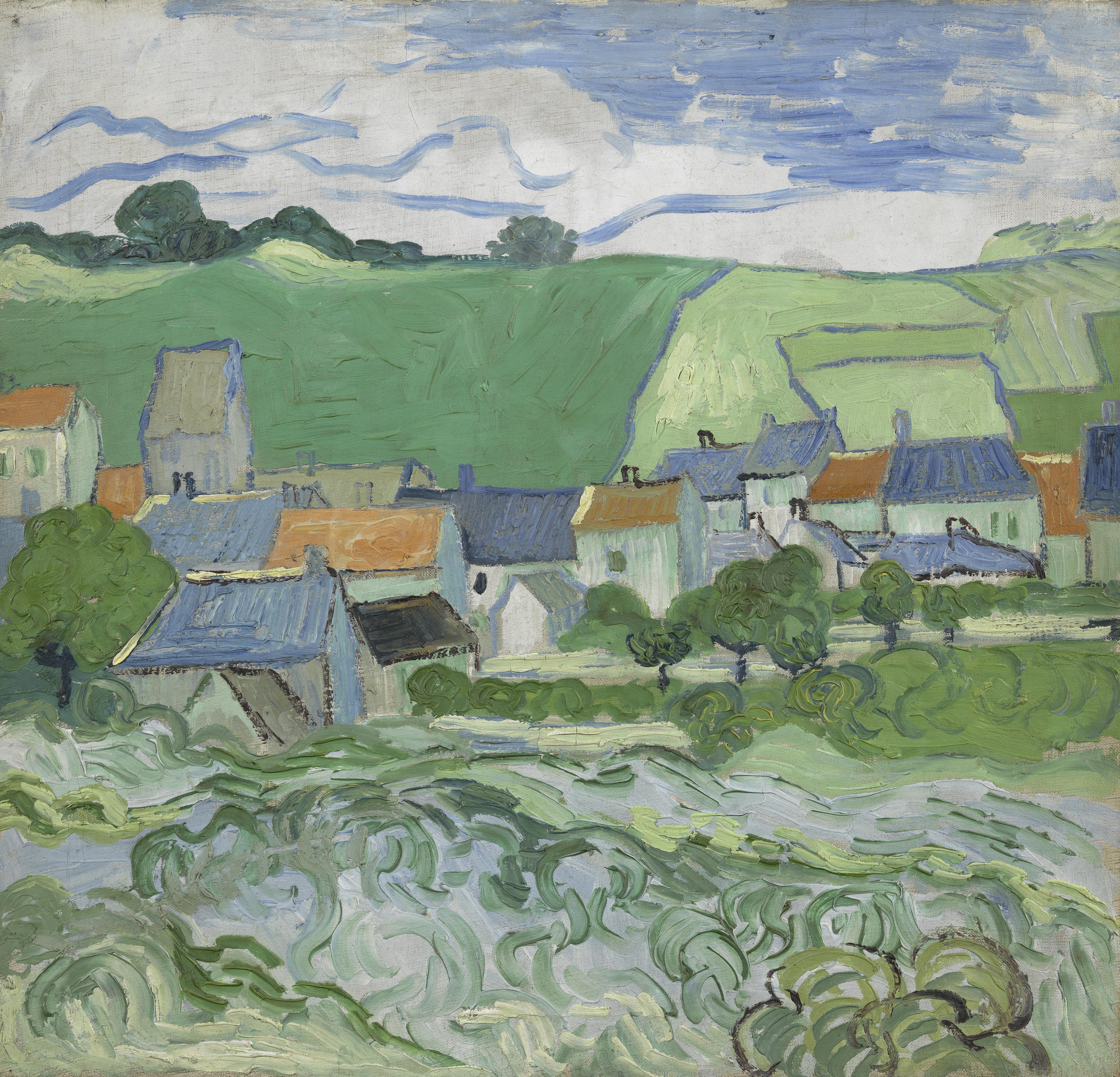
F799: Houses in Auvers, Van Gogh Museum

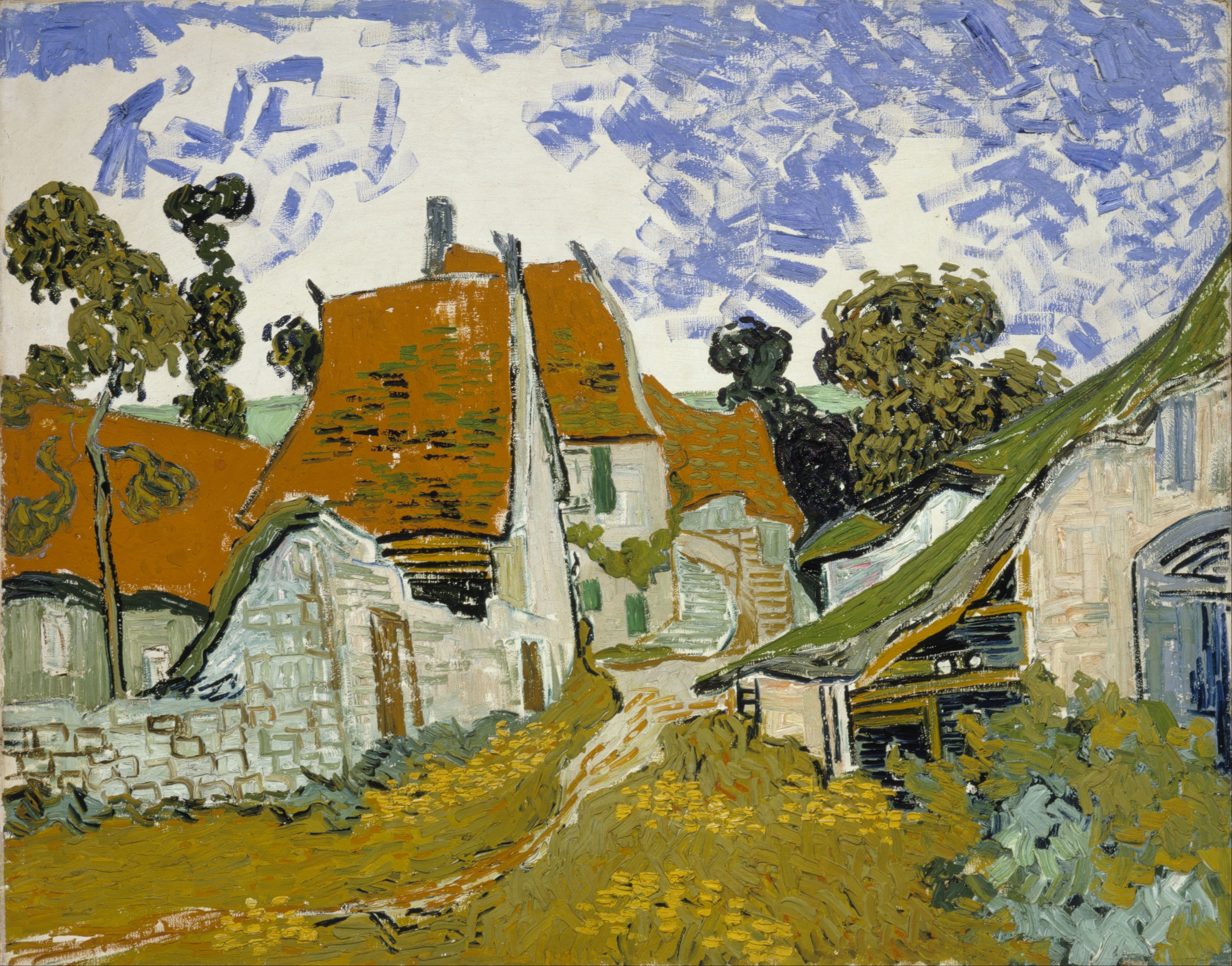
F802: Village Street, Ateneum

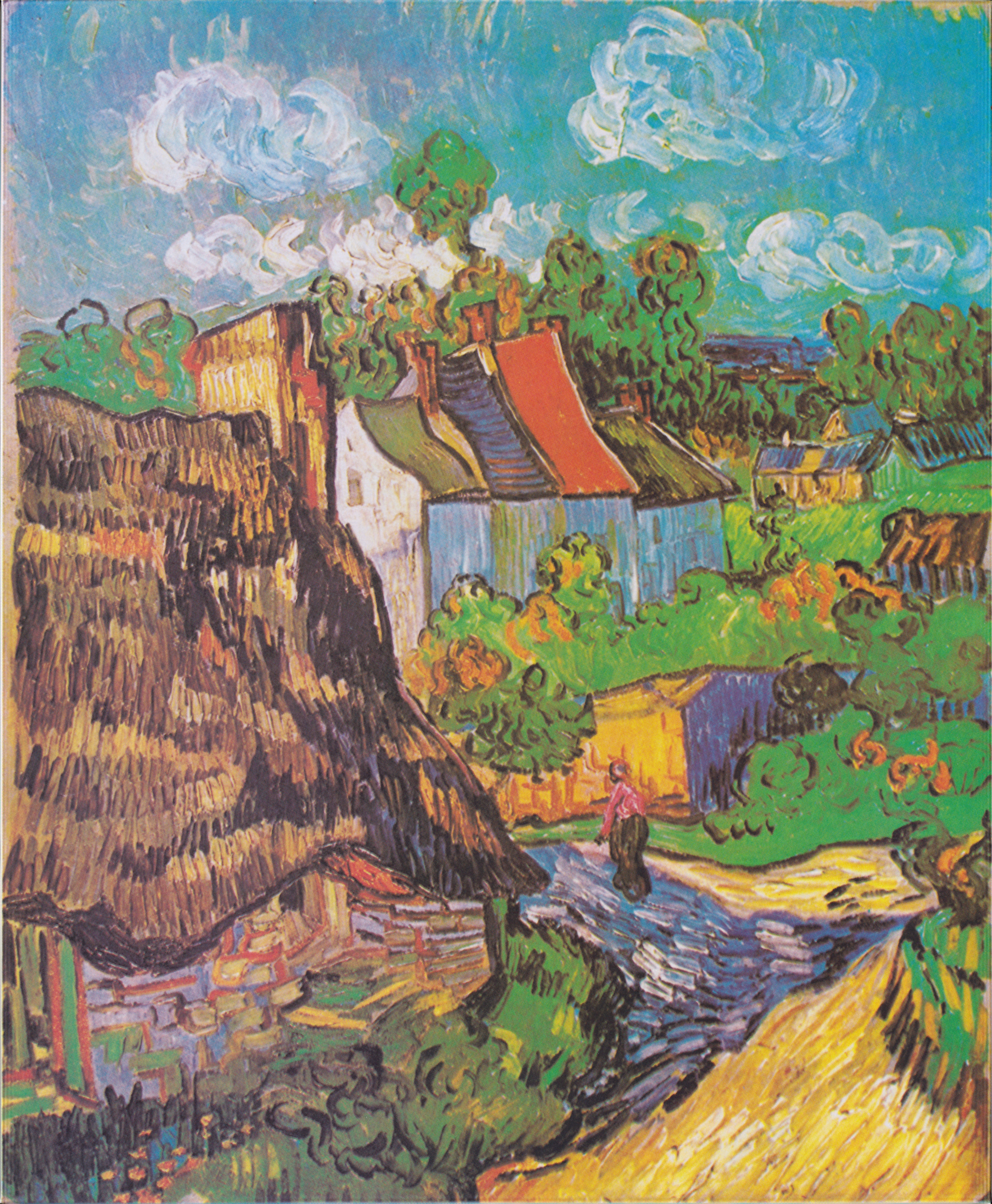
F805: Houses at Auvers, Museum of Fine Arts, Boston
- F750 Thatched Cottage and Houses was probably the first landscape van Gogh painted at Auvers. Writing to Theo and Jo around 21 May, Vincent says: "Now I have a study of old thatched roofs with a field of peas in flower and some wheat in the foreground, hilly background.. ", and continues with a remark that it did him good to go into the south, "the better to see the north". Van Der Veen & Knapp point out the serene calm of the painting; not a breath of wind disturbs the smoke rising from the chimney.
- F770 Landscape at Twilight is a view of the château at Auvers. It was the first of the double-square canvases and van Gogh described it in a letter to Theo of 24 June. It was the only view he made of the château. The twilight is conveyed by heavy strokes of orange and yellow, but the sun itself is not seen. Nowhere in the Auvers painting did van Gogh directly depict the sun. Van Der Veen and Knapp note that there is a figure under the back pear tree, barely delineated in a few strokes. They describe the painting as a masterpiece of subtlety and form by a painter at the peak of his powers.
- F789 The Church at Auvers, a size 30 canvas, is described in a letter of 5 June to his sister Wil: "... It's again almost the same thing as the studies I did in Nuenen of the old tower and the cemetery." The study he was referring to was F84:The Old Church Tower at Nuenen, which he had already said he would like to redo as one of his "reminisces of the North" at Saint Rémy. Hulsker remarks that The Starry Night is probably the only painting that matches it in its intensity of colour and emotional charge.

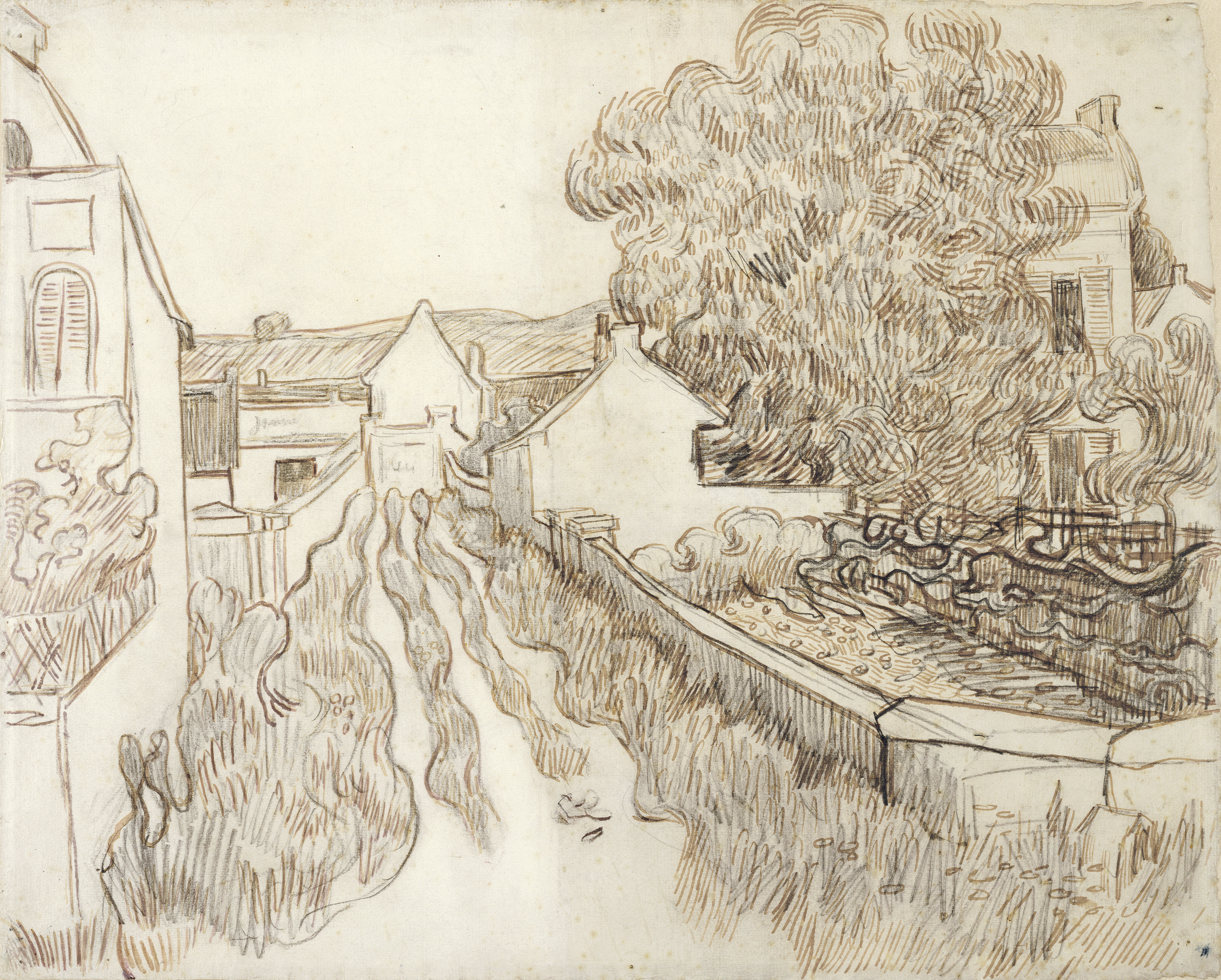
F1638r: Dead End Street with Houses, Van Gogh Museum

- De La Faille gives the location of F791 The House of Père Pilon as 18 rue Francois Villon (49°4′13.02″N 2°8′40.12″E), midway between the Auberge Ravoux and 5 Rue de Gré. Père Pilon's villa was one of the grander modern villas in Auvers and is partly obscured in the picture by a large chestnut tree. In the letter Vincent sent Theo and Jo the day after his arrival, he said he found the villas of Auvers almost as attractive as the thatched cottages. Pickvance says the picture may have been painted as early as 24 May and that the halo effect of the sky may reflect the wet and stormy weather van Gogh experienced on Saturday 24 and Sunday 25 May. Van Der Veen and Knapp point out a preparatory study F1638r (right) in the Van Gogh Museum.
- The location of F795 Village street and stairs in Auvers with figures is the Rue de la Sansonne directly opposite the Auberge Ravoux, though the stairs connecting the two streets are no longer there. There is a smaller companion piece F796 showing the same site whose authenticity Van Der Veen and Knapp question.

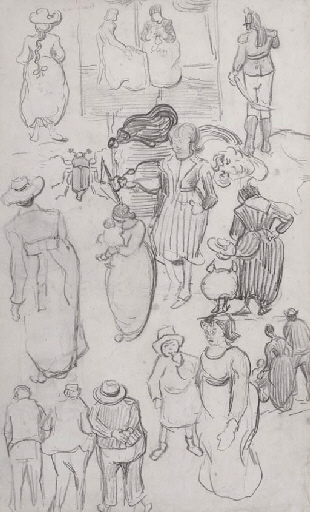
F1652r: Sheet with Many Sketches of Figures, Private collection

- A sheet of figure studies F1652r (right) has at its upper left a young girl seen from behind very close to the lower rightmost girl in the painting. The profile of a young girl to the right on the sheet is recognizably Adeline Ravoux, daughter of the innkeeper at the Auberge Ravoux—where van Gogh lodged. She is the subject of portraits F768, F786, and F769. The young girl seen from behind is assumed to be her as well. As well as F795, she is thought to appear in a number of other paintings, including F819 Two Ladies Walking in a Landscape. The sheet sold for $4,480,000 at a Christie's sale in 2007.

- F802 Village Street is a considerable curiosity as it was one of ten paintings exhibited at a Salon des Artistes Indépendants exhibition in 1891 a year after van Gogh's death. The catalogue entry read Village (dernière esquisse) i.e. "Village (last work)". There is no mention of the painting in the letters and presumably its unfinished nature was responsible for calling it van Gogh's last painting. Pickvance notes the energy of the painting, betraying no indication of a tormented mind. Hulsker noted its lively colour accents give it a cheerful aspect, to be found repeatedly in other paintings of the same sort at this time. Van Der Veen & Knapp think it was part of a series of views of the village made between the end of May and the beginning of June and that it is unfinished simply because van Gogh abandoned it, dissatisfied with the results he was getting. It has the distinction of being the first van Gogh painting ever to be purchased by a museum, the Ateneum purchasing it in 1903 from the estate of Julien Leclercq, who had organised one of the earliest van Gogh exhibitions.
- De La Faille gives the location of F805 Houses at Auvers as 2 Rue Marceau (49°4′16.21″N 2°8′58.99″E), about 200 yards east of 5 Rue de Gré. However, the correct address is 4 Rue Marceau. There were originally two farms, from the Caffin Family and the Youtte Family. Albert Caffin was the mayor of the town, who also signed Vincent Van Gogh's death certificate. Hulsker includes it amongst his list of cheerful canvases enlivened by colour accents. Van Der Veen and Knapp place the painting as a continuation of van Gogh's early exploration of the village, contrasting it with the Dutch cottage F90 Cottage and Woman with a Goat he had painted a few years before in Nuenen and a companion piece to F83 The Cottage he had considered redoing as one of his "reminisces of the North" in Saint-Rémy. They note the use of complementary colours, for example the blue shadow of the foreground cottage cast on the yellow path. The painting was awarded top prize at the Boston Museum of Fine Arts' first "crowd-sourced" exhibition—"Boston Loves Impressionism". (Note: "The public was given the opportunity to cast their votes on a group of 50 Impressionist and Post-Impressionist masterpieces from the MFA's collection.... With 4,464 votes, van Gogh's Houses at Auvers won the top prize, perhaps indicating the public's shifting allegiance from Monet and the Impressionists towards Post-Impressionism. However, Cézanne—who can also be categorized as a Post-Impressionist—has only one work voted into the show." the top three works at the exhibition were: 1. Houses at Auvers, 1890, Vincent van Gogh (4,464 votes); 2. Water Lilies, 1907, Claude Monet (3,543 votes); 3. Little Fourteen-Year-Old Dancer, original model 1878–81, cast after 1921, Edgar Degas (2,869 votes))

== Provenance ==
The Toledo Museum of Art purchased Houses at Auvers in 1935 with funds from the Libbey Endowment, the gift of Edward Libbey. The work had previously been owned by André Bonger of Amsterdam.

The painting was first shown at the 1905 Amsterdam exhibition and has been since exhibited all over the world, including at the Metropolitan Museum of Art.

== See also ==
- List of works by Vincent van Gogh
