= Farms near Auvers =

Painting by Vincent van Gogh

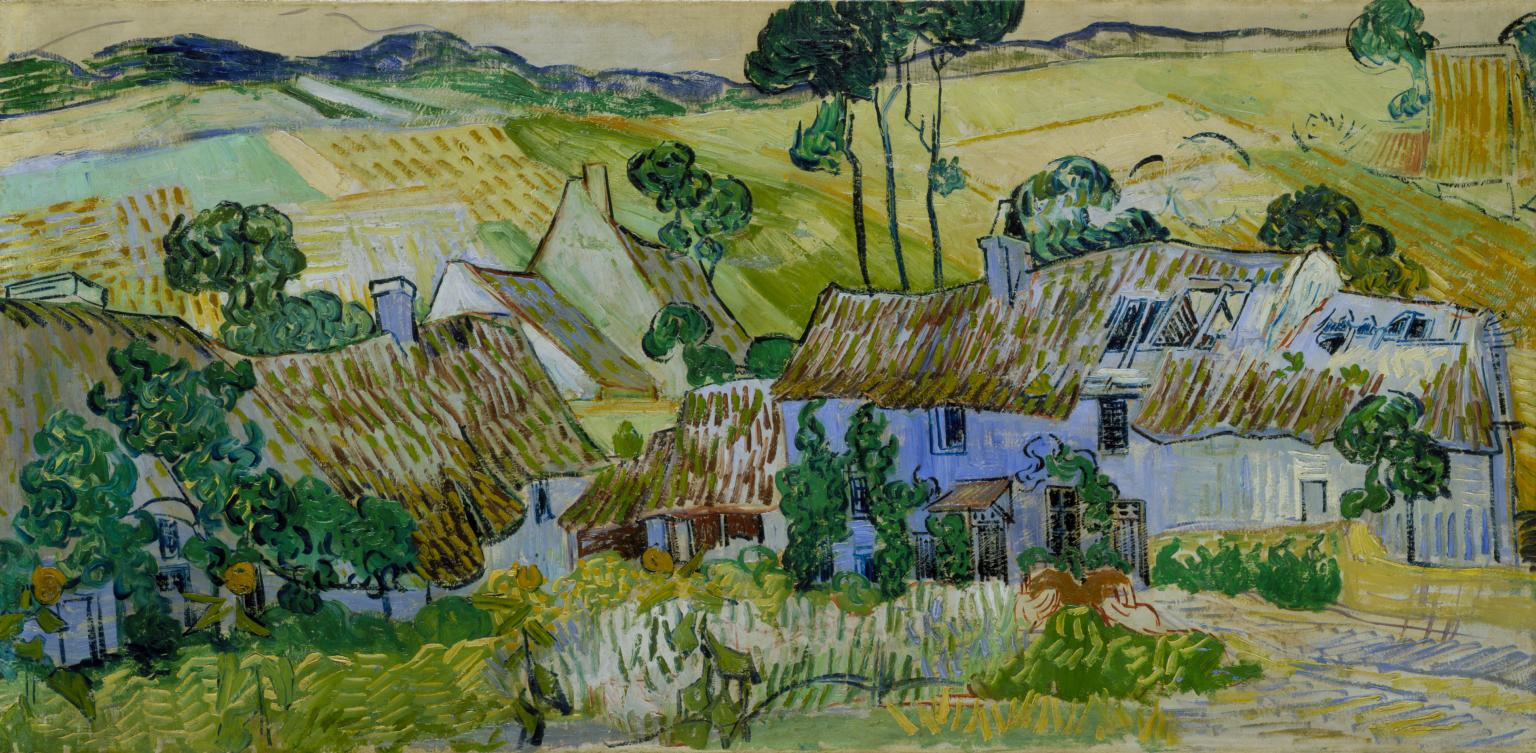
- Artist: Vincent van Gogh
- Year: 1890
- Catalogue: F793; JH2114
- Medium: Oil on canvas
- Dimensions: 50.2 cm × 100.3 cm (19.7 in × 39.5 in)
- Location: The National Gallery, London

Farms near Auvers or Thatched Cottages by a Hill is an oil painting by Vincent van Gogh that he painted in July 1890 when he lived in Auvers-sur-Oise, France. The painting is an example of the double-square canvases that he employed in his last landscapes.

Van Gogh spent the last few months of his life in Auvers-sur-Oise, a small town just north of Paris, after he left an asylum at Saint-Rémy in May 1890. Shortly after arriving at Auvers, Van Gogh wrote his sister Wil: "Here there are roofs of mossy thatch which are superb, and of which I’ll certainly do something." Their shapes are mimicked by the fields and hills behind. The hasty brushwork and blank sky suggest that the painting is unfinished. It is similar to Thatched Cottages and Houses, a painting thought to have been executed shortly after arrival at Auvers.

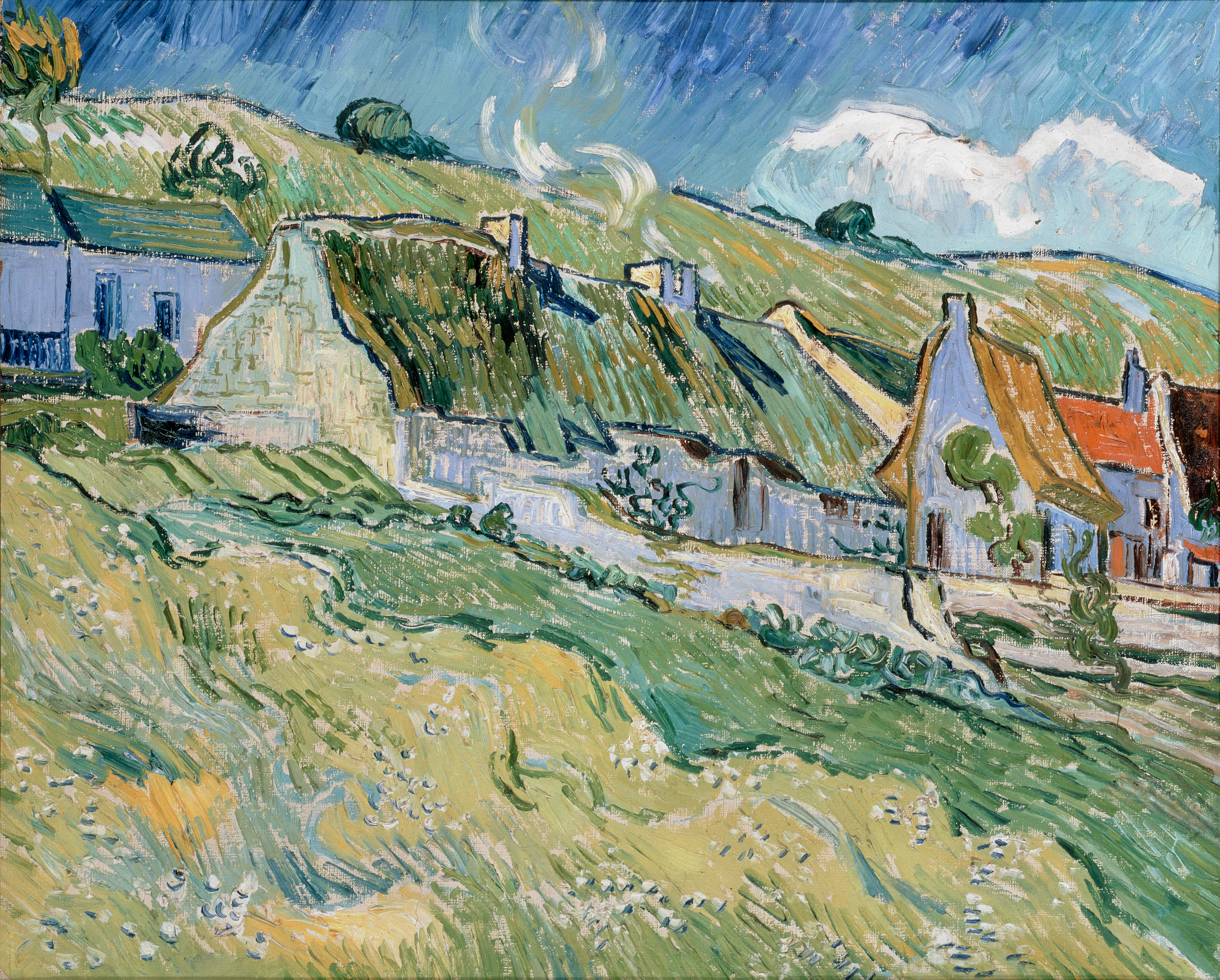
Thatched Cottages and Houses, Musée d'Orsay, 1890

In 1933 the painting was bequeathed by C. Frank Stoop to the Tate Collection in London, though it is currently on loan to The National Gallery. It was made a month before the artist’s death.

== See also ==
- Auvers size 30 canvases
- Cottages (Van Gogh series)
- Double-square painting
- Houses at Auvers
- Impressionism
- List of works by Vincent van Gogh
- Peasant Character Studies (Van Gogh series)
- Postimpressionism
- Saint-Paul Asylum, Saint-Rémy (Van Gogh series)
