= The Church at Auvers =

Painting by Vincent van Gogh

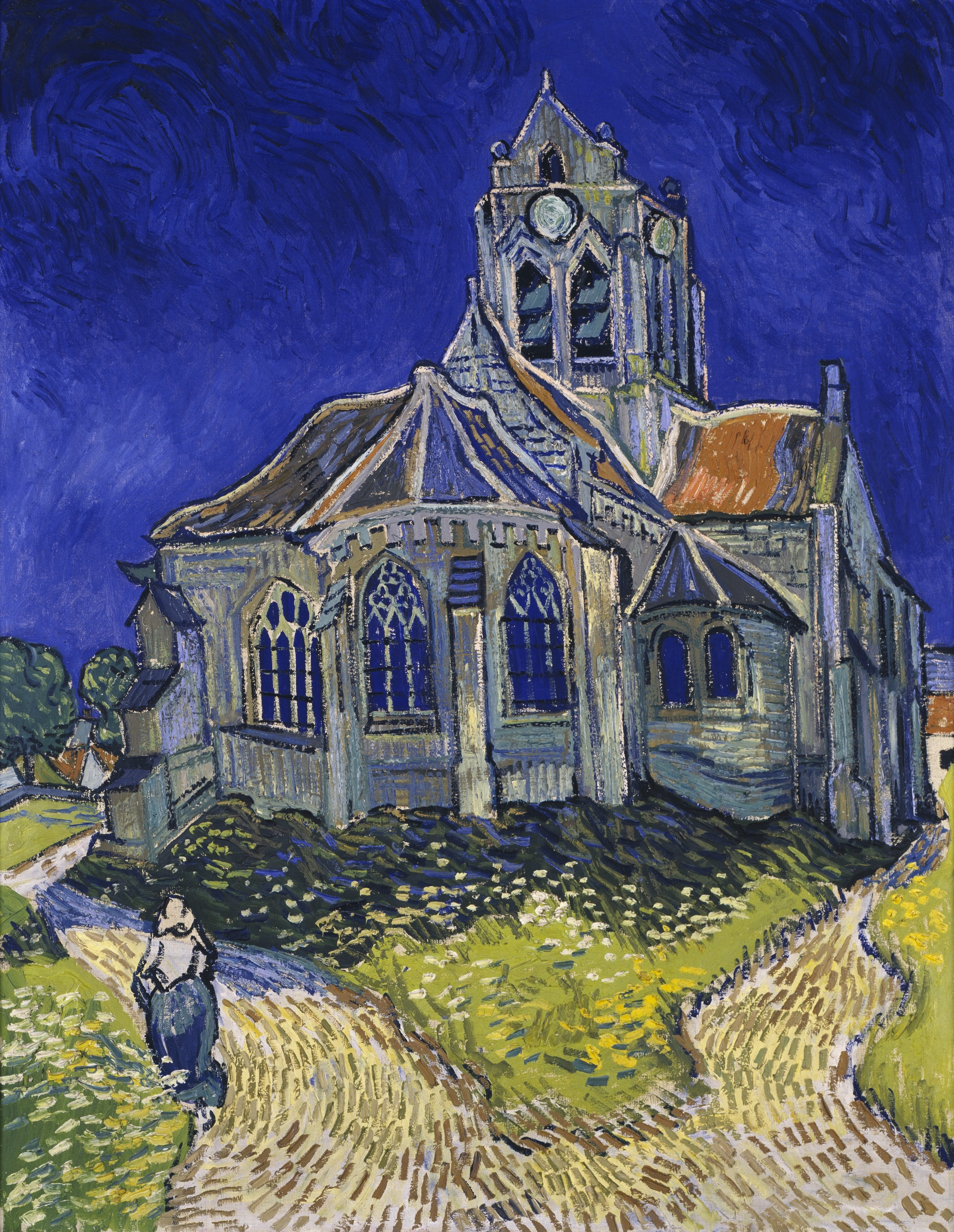
- Artist: Vincent van Gogh
- Year: 1890
- Catalogue: F789; JH2006
- Medium: Oil on canvas
- Movement: Post Impressionism
- Dimensions: 74 cm × 94 cm (37 in × 29.1 in)
- Location: Musée d'Orsay, Paris
- Website: musee-orsay.fr/en/

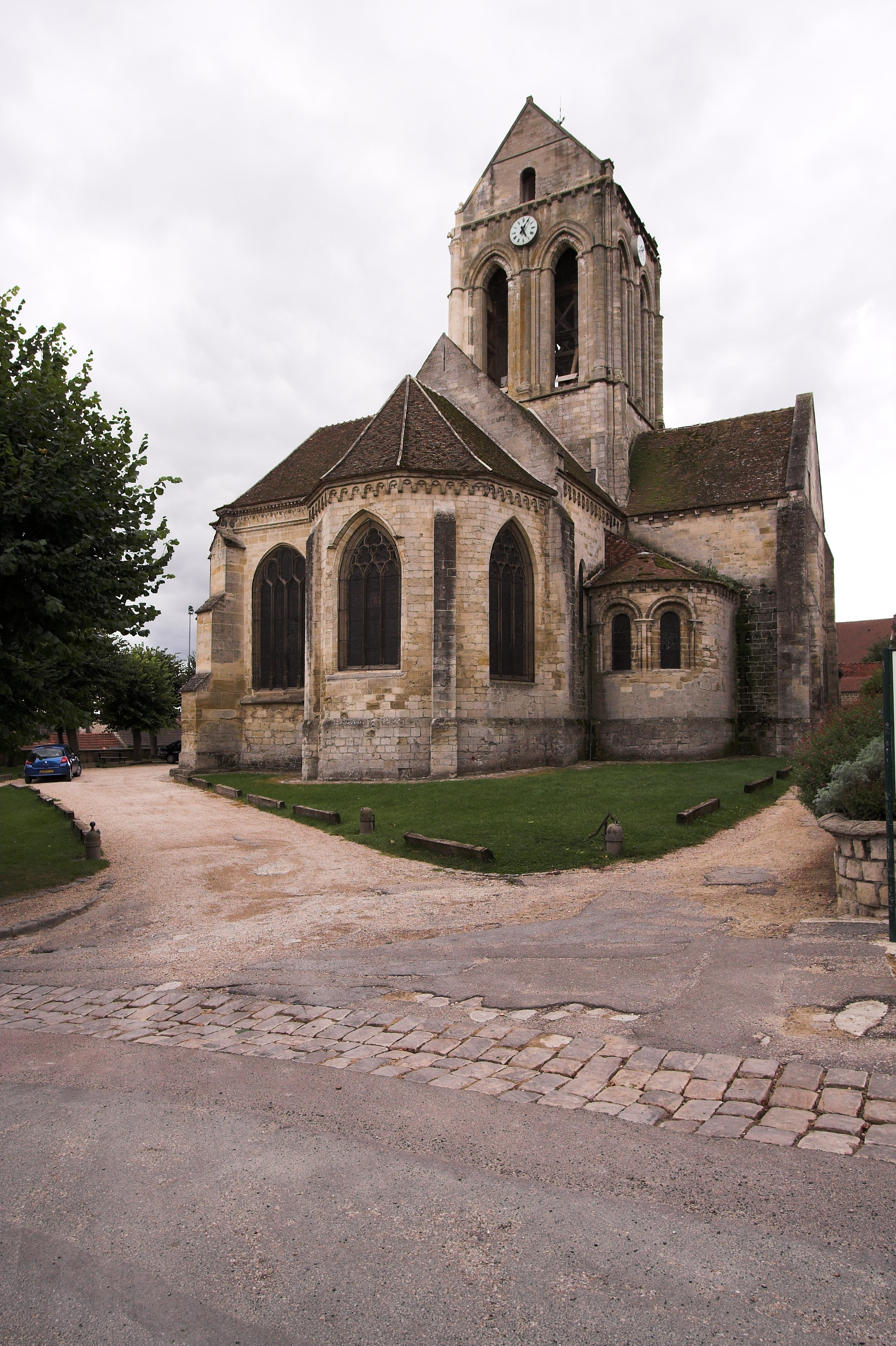
The church in 2006

The Church at Auvers is an oil painting created by Dutch Post-Impressionist artist Vincent van Gogh in June 1890 which now hangs in the Musée d'Orsay in Paris, France.

The painting depicts the Église Notre-Dame-de-l'Assomption in Auvers-sur-Oise, France, 27 kilometres (17 mi) north-west of Paris.

== History ==
The Church at Auvers — along with other canvases such as The Town Hall at Auvers and several drawings of small houses with thatched roofs — is reminiscent of scenes from his Nuenen period. A certain nostalgia for the north had already been apparent in his last weeks in Saint-Rémy-de-Provence: in a letter written a couple of weeks before his departure, he wrote "While I was ill I nevertheless did some little canvases from memory which you will see later, memories of the North."

He specifically refers to similar work done back at Nuenen when he describes this painting in a letter to his sister Wilhelmina on 5 June 1890:

I have a larger picture of the village church — an effect in which the building appears to be violet-hued against a sky of simple deep blue colour, pure cobalt; the stained-glass windows appear as ultramarine blotches, the roof is violet and partly orange. In the foreground some green plants in bloom, and sand with the pink flow of sunshine in it. And once again it is nearly the same thing as the studies I did in Nuenen of the old tower and the cemetery, only it is probably that now the colour is more expressive, more sumptuous.

The "simple deep blue" was also used in Portrait of Adeline Ravoux, painted in the same short period in Auvers-sur-Oise.

The foreground of The Church at Auvers is brightly lit by the sun, but the church itself sits in its own shadow, and "neither reflects nor emanates any light of its own." After Van Gogh had been dismissed from the evangelistic career he had hoped to continue in the Borinage, Belgium, he wrote to his brother Theo from Cuesmes in July 1880, and quoted Shakespeare's image from Henry IV, Part 1 of the dark emptiness inside a church to symbolize "empty and unenlightened preaching": "Their God is like the God of Shakespeare's drunken Falstaff, 'the inside of a church'"

The motif of diverging paths also appears in his painting Wheat Field with Crows.

== In popular culture ==
The Church at Auvers plays a prominent role in "Vincent and the Doctor", a 2010 episode of the British science-fiction television programme Doctor Who, although the scenes at the church were filmed at Llandaff Cathedral in Wales.

== See also ==
- List of works by Vincent van Gogh
