= Église Notre-Dame-de-l'Assomption d'Auvers-sur-Oise =

Roman Catholic church in Auvers-sur-Oise, a commune in the Val-d'Oise, France

Coordinates: 49°04′19″N 2°10′34″E

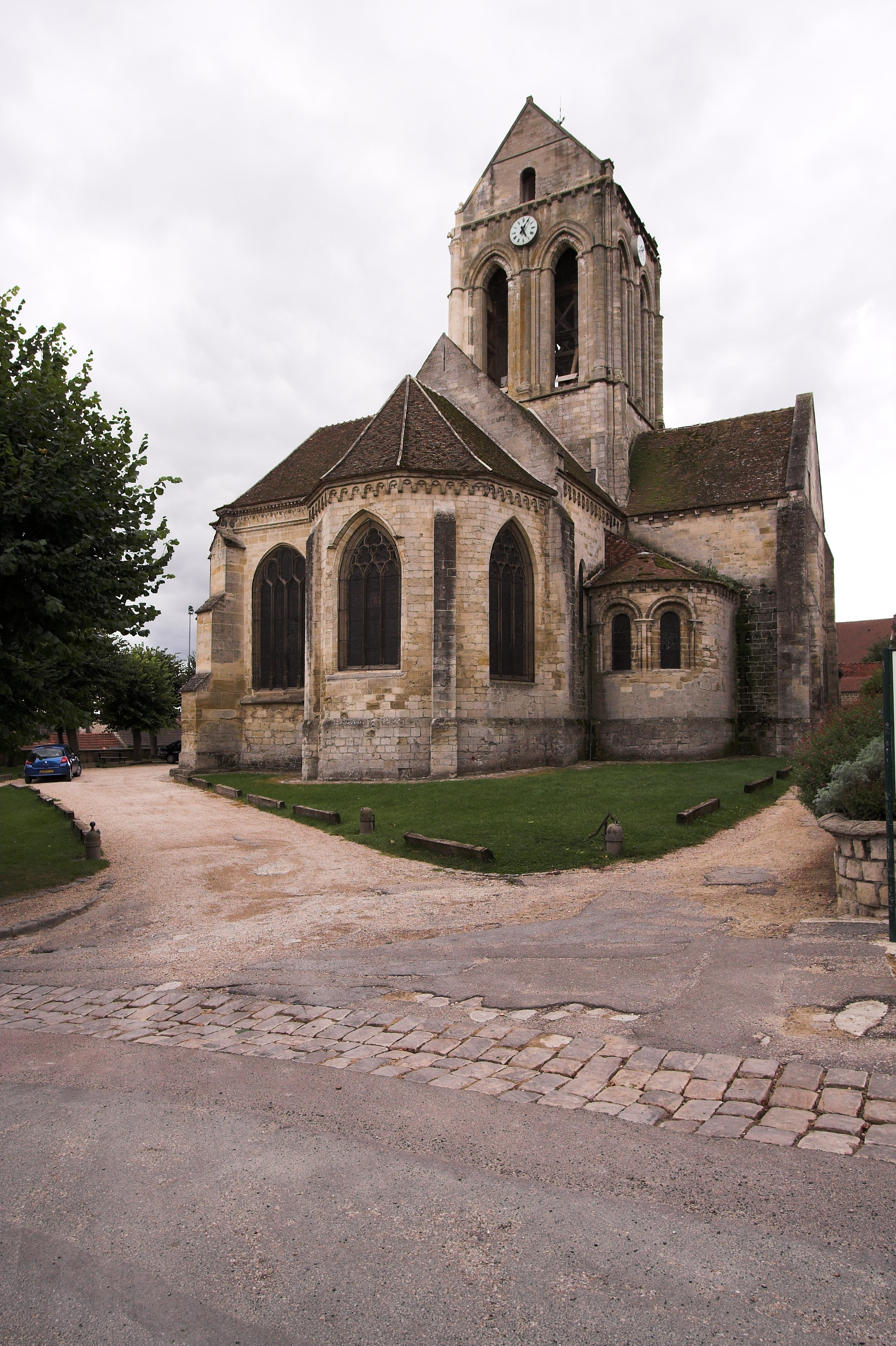
The church in 2006

The Église Notre-Dame-de-l'Assomption is a Roman Catholic parish church located in Auvers-sur-Oise, a commune in the Val-d'Oise department of the Île-de-France region, France. It is known for its historical architecture and its depiction in Vincent van Gogh's 1890 painting The Church at Auvers

== History ==
The church was originally founded towards the end of the 11th century under the reign of King Philippe I, near a royal manor in Auvers-sur-Oise, which became part of the royal domain in 1081. It was rebuilt starting in 1137 at the initiative of Adelaide of Savoy, widow of King Louis VI, who frequently resided in the nearby manor. Construction began with the eastern parts and concluded with the nave, spanning the transition from late Romanesque to early Gothic styles. The northern absidiole remains purely Romanesque, while the nave, completed between 1190 and 1225, features a three-level elevation with a triforium, inspired by the Notre-Dame Cathedral in Paris. The church also includes early Gothic elements like pointed arch windows and ribbed vaults, with its elegant bell tower, one of the first Gothic belfries in the Vexin region, likely completed before 1170.

The church endured through centuries with minimal damage from wars. A notable addition was the Chapel of the Virgin, constructed just before the mid-16th century. It was first classified as a historical monument in 1856, but poorly executed interior restorations led to its declassification in 1874. It was reclassified in 1915, recognizing its architectural value as a prime example of early Gothic design. An external staircase, built in 1615 by Jean-Francois de Berbis, lord of Hérouville and Auvers, was part of a fortification system and is also a classified monument.

== Cultural significance ==
The church gained international fame through Vincent van Gogh's painting The Church at Auvers, created in June 1890 during his final months in Auvers-sur-Oise. The artwork, is currently displayed in the Musée d'Orsay in Paris. Van Gogh was buried Auvers-sur-Oise cemetery near to the church.
