= White House at Night =

Painting by Vincent van Gogh

- Artist: Vincent van Gogh
- Year: 1890
- Catalogue: F766; JH2031
- Medium: Oil on canvas
- Dimensions: 59 cm × 72.5 cm (23.2 in × 28.5 in)
- Location: Hermitage Museum, Saint Petersburg

White House at Night is an oil-on-canvas painting created on 16 June 1890 in the small town of Auvers-sur-Oise by Vincent van Gogh, six weeks before his death. It is displayed at the Hermitage Museum, St. Petersburg.

According to the Hermitage Museum, the painting "expresses the great psychological tension under which Van Gogh found himself"; two of the windows, considered the "eyes" of a home, are rendered with "alarming" red splashes, while the star, a sign of fate, is seen as symbolic of van Gogh's anguish.

It is thought that van Gogh painted White House at Night around 8:00 PM due to the position of the "star" in the painting. Astronomers Donald Olson and Russell Doescher from the Texas State University-San Marcos calculated that the star in the painting must be Venus which was bright in the evening sky in June 1890. The house is the same one depicted in Blossoming Chestnut Tree.

The painting has a turbulent history. It was exhibited in Switzerland several times during the 1920s, but in the late 1920s disappeared into the private collection of German industrialist Otto Krebs. Many of his acquisitions were of a style which was soon to be labelled "degenerate art" by the Nazis, which contributed towards the already publicity-shy Krebs keeping his collection secret.

Thought to have been lost after World War II, the painting languished in the Hermitage archives for fifty years before resurfacing in 1995 as part of an exhibition displaying artworks looted by the Soviets at the end of the war. Three other van Goghs from Krebs's collection were also shown: Landscape with House and Ploughman, Morning: Going out to Work (After Millet), and the Portrait of Madame Trabuc.

== See also ==
- List of works by Vincent van Gogh
- Art theft and looting during World War II
