= Portrait of Adeline Ravoux =

1890 painting by Vincent van Gogh

- Artist: Vincent van Gogh
- Year: 1890
- Location: Cleveland Museum of Art

Portrait of Adeline Ravoux is an oil painting from June 1890 by Vincent van Gogh.

It is in the collection of the Cleveland Museum of Art.

== Description ==
The twelve-year-old Adeline Ravoux was the daughter of Arthur-Gustave Ravoux, whose inn is where Van Gogh lodged in Auvers-sur-Oise. She later wrote a memoir of Van Gogh's stay with them. She witnessed Van Gogh's return to the inn after the fatal incident where he shot himself: "Vincent walked bent, holding his stomach, again exaggerating his habit of holding one shoulder higher than the other. Mother asked him: " M. Vincent, we were anxious, we are happy to see you to return; have you had a problem?" He replied in a suffering voice: "No, but I have…" he did not finish, crossed the hall, took the staircase and climbed to his bedroom. I was witness to this scene. Vincent made on us such a strange impression that Father got up and went to the staircase to see if he could hear anything."

== Other versions ==
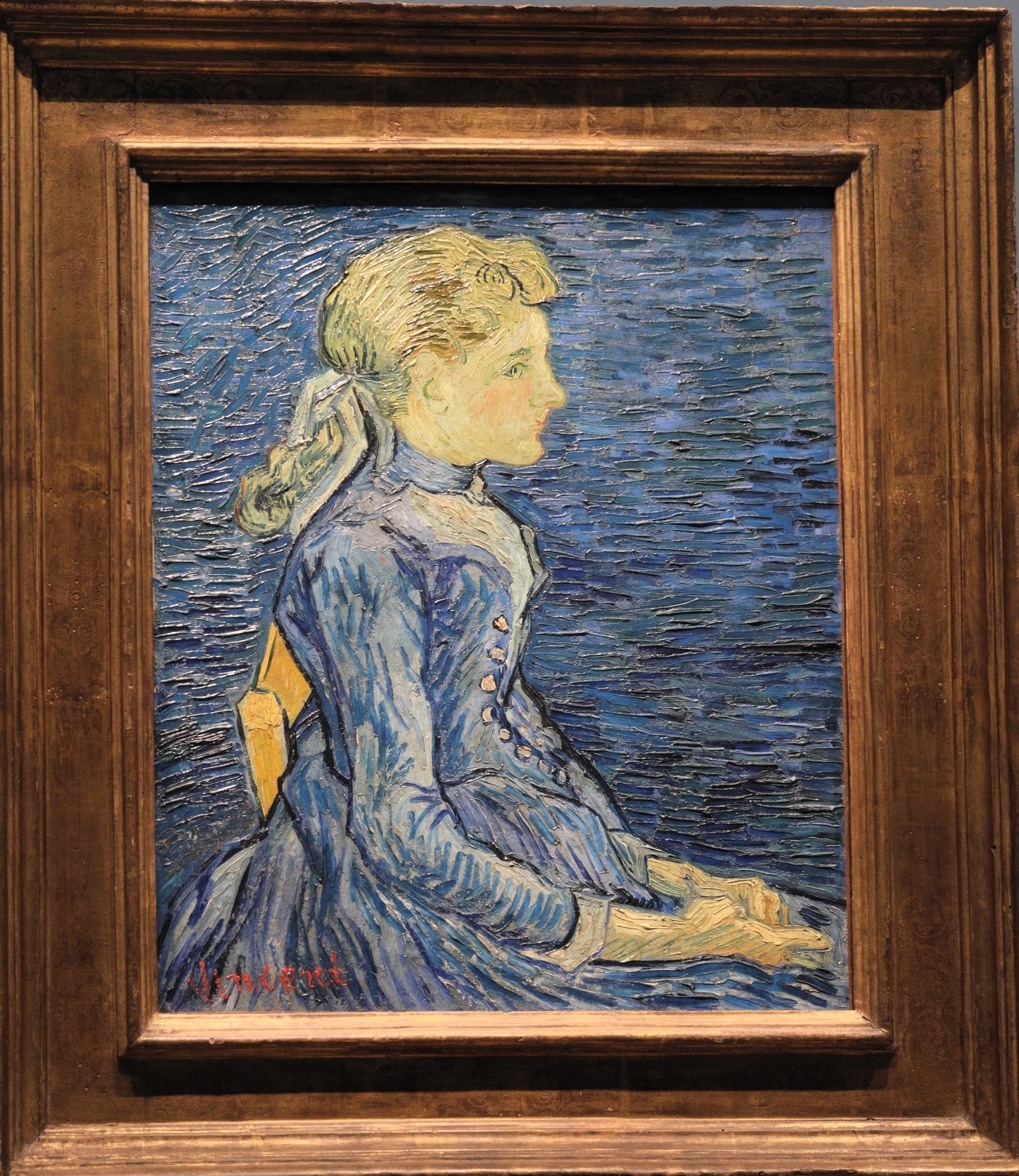

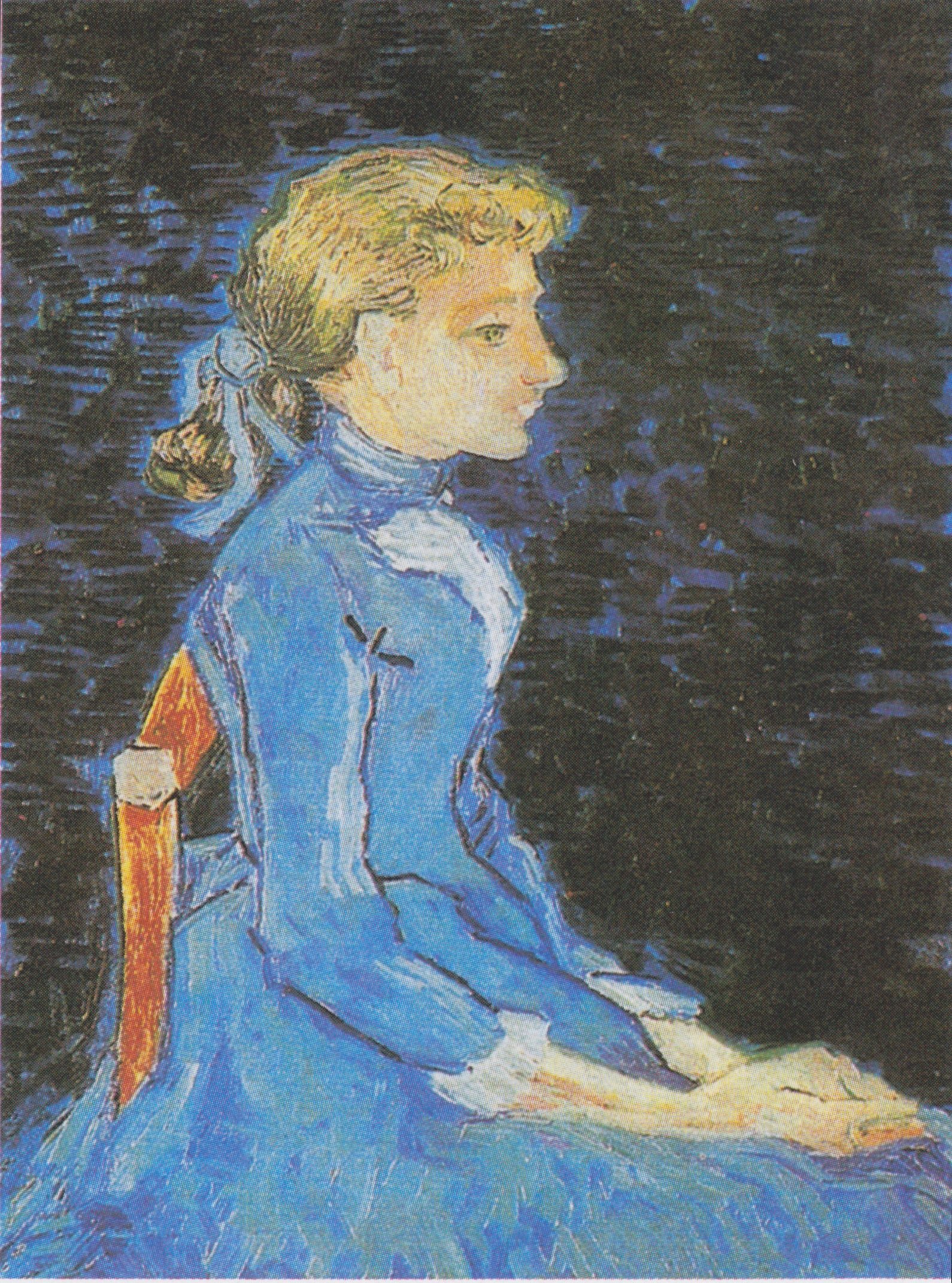

== See also ==
- List of works by Vincent van Gogh
