= Thatched Cottages and Houses =

1890 oil painting by Vincent van Gogh

Thatched cottages at Cordeville, 1890
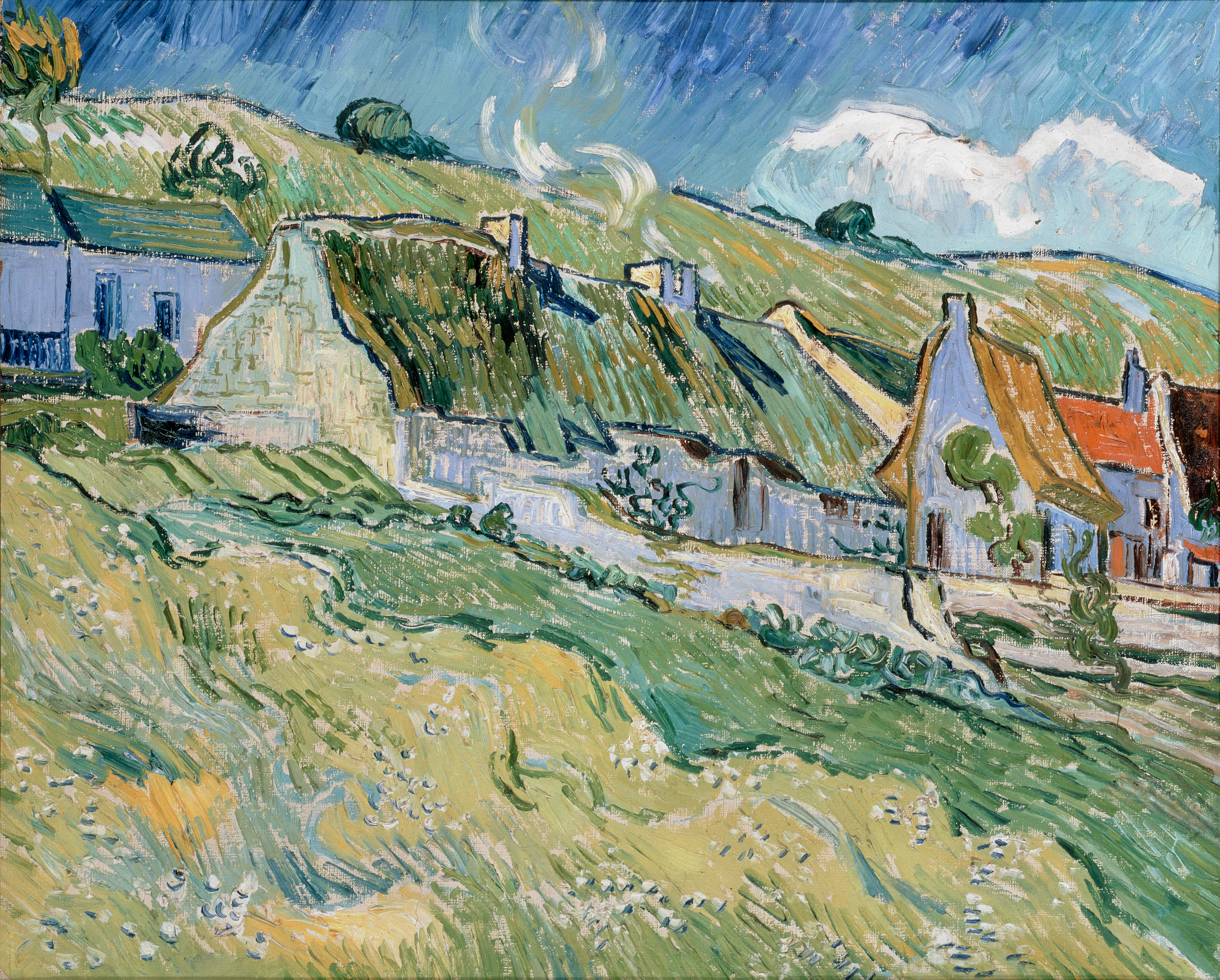
- Artist: Vincent van Gogh
- Year: 1890
- Catalogue: F750; JH1984
- Medium: Oil on canvas
- Dimensions: 60 cm × 73 cm (24.0 in × 27.8 in)
- Location: Musée d'Orsay, Paris
- Website: Chaumes de Cordeville à Auvers-sur-Oise

Thatched Cottages at Cordeville, 1890 or Chaumes de Cordeville à Auvers-sur-Oise (literally Thatches of Cordeville at Auvers-sur-Oise) is an oil painting by Vincent van Gogh that was painted in May 1890 while living in Auvers-sur-Oise, France.

Van Gogh spent the last few months of his life in Auvers-sur-Oise, a small town just north of Paris, after he left the asylum in Saint-Rémy in May 1890.

Thatched Cottage of Cordeville, 1890 or Chaumes de Cordeville à Auvers-sur-Oise (literally Thatches of Cordeville at Auvers-sur-Oise) is thought to be the study he mentions in his letter of 21 May 1890 to his brother Theo and wife Jo immediately after arriving in Auvers:"... when I wrote to you I hadn’t yet done anything. Now I have a study of old thatched roofs with a field of peas in flower and some wheat in the foreground, hilly background. A study which I think you’ll like."

Hulsker believes the painting is amongst a group of 20 or so works executed by Vincent immediately after his arrival in Auvers, May 20, and the remainder of the month:" ... we immediately see in this painting the bright colours that, generally speaking, are characteristic of the Auvers period and differentiate them somewhat from the paintings done in Saint-Rémy - although there is naturally no question of a real break with the past from one week to the next."

The painting is in the Musee d'Orsay.

See Van Gogh, Artistic breakthrough and final years, Auves-sur-Oise

== See also ==
- Cottages series
- Houses at Auvers
- Impressionism
- List of works by Vincent van Gogh
- Postimpressionism
- Saint-Paul Asylum, Saint-Remy series.
