= 1890 in art =

The year 1890 in art involved some significant events.

== Events ==
- January 18 – February 23 – Seventh annual exhibition of Les XX in Brussels includes a display of work by Vincent van Gogh. Henry de Groux criticises his paintings but Albert Aurier praises them. From the exhibition, van Gogh sells The Red Vineyard to Anna Boch, said to be the only sale of his work during his lifetime.
- March 20 – April 27 – The Société des Artistes Indépendants show in Paris includes a major display of van Gogh paintings.
- May 20 – Van Gogh moves to Auvers-sur-Oise on the edge of Paris in the care of Dr Paul Gachet where he will produce around seventy paintings in as many days. More than a dozen are size 30 canvases (92 x 65 cm).
- June–July – Van Gogh develops his double-square painting technique, e.g. in the July paintings Wheatfield with Crows and Wheatfield Under Thunderclouds.
- July 27 – Death of Vincent van Gogh: van Gogh perhaps paints Tree Roots, then apparently shoots himself, dying two days later.
- September 20 – Theo van Gogh, assisted by Émile Bernard, mounts an improvised retrospective exhibition of his brother Vincent's works in Theo's former Paris apartment.
- November – Lucien Pissarro settles permanently in London.
- Société Nationale des Beaux-Arts revived in Paris under the leadership of Ernest Meissonier (its President), Pierre Puvis de Chavannes, Jules Dalou, Auguste Rodin, Carolus-Duran, Bracquemond and Albert-Ernest Carrier-Belleuse, with an annual exhibition reviewed as the Salon de Champ-de-Mars, opening a fortnight later than the official Paris Salon.
- Claude Monet begins painting his Haystacks series.
- Newlyn Industrial Class set up at the fishing port in Cornwall (England) and begins production of Newlyn Copper repoussé work.

== Works ==
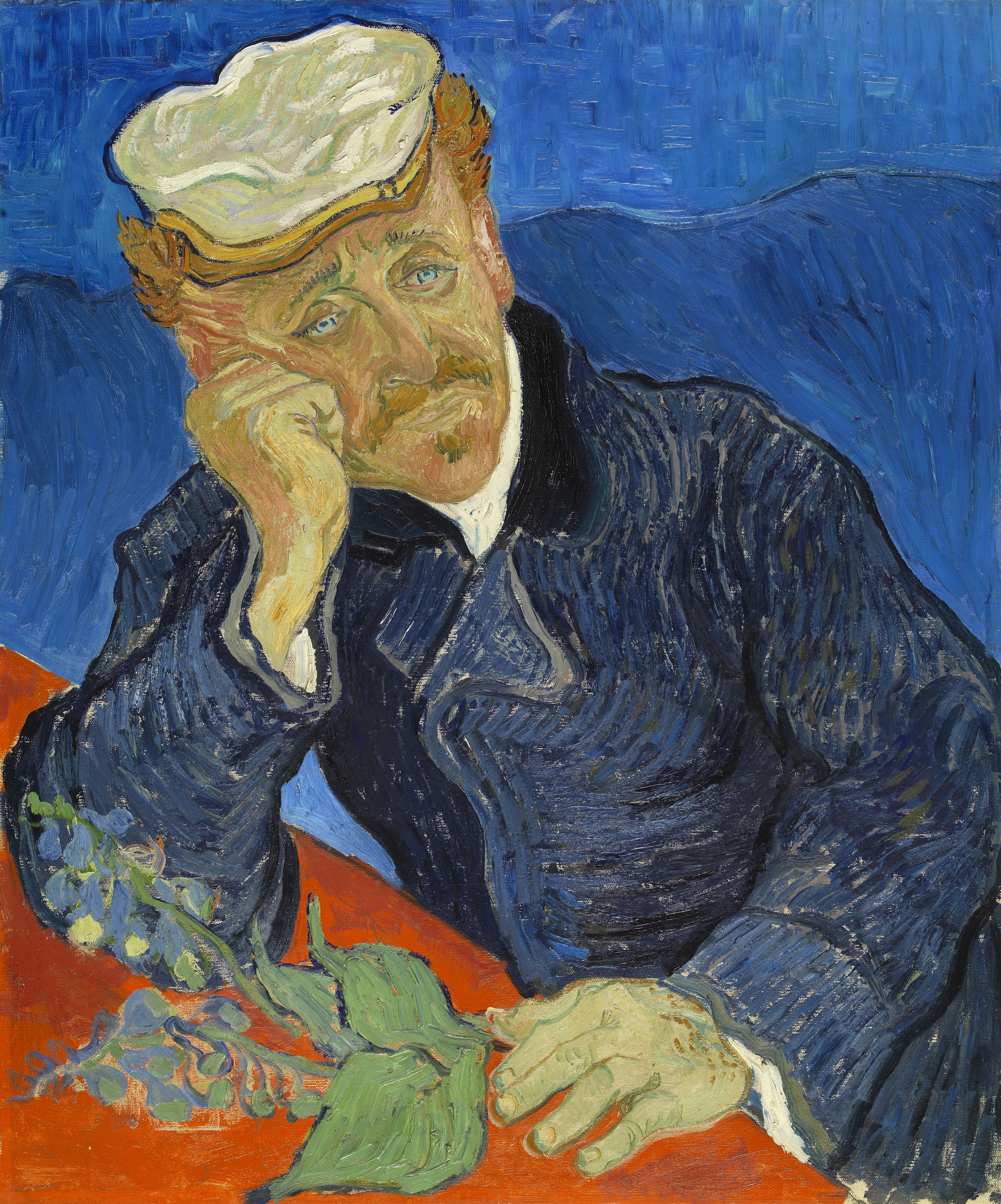
Vincent van Gogh – Portrait of Dr. Gachet, 1890 (Musée d'Orsay, Paris)

- Anna Ancher – Syende fiskerpige (Sewing Fisherman's Wife)
- William-Adolphe Bouguereau
  - L'Amour et Psyché, enfants
  - The Bohemian
  - Gabrielle Cot
  - A Little Coaxing
- Frank Brangwyn – Funeral at Sea
- John Brett – Echoes of a Far-Off Storm
- Dennis Miller Bunker – Jessica
- Edward Burne-Jones
  - The Legend of Briar Rose
  - with William Morris and John Henry Dearle – The Adoration of the Magi (tapestry woven by Morris & Co. for Exeter College, Oxford)
- John Collier – The Death of Cleopatra
- Cyrus Edwin Dallin – Signal of Peace (bronze)
- Thomas Dewing – Summer
- Francis Edwin Elwell – Dickens and Little Nell (bronze)
- Henri Fantin-Latour – Portrait of Sonia
- Fidus (Hugo Höppener) – Light Prayer
- Jean-Léon Gérôme – Working in Marble
- J. W. Godward
  - Athenais
  - Flowers Of Venus
  - A Pompeian Bath
- James Guthrie – The Morning Paper
- John Haberle – The Palette
- William Harnett – The Faithful Colt (Wadsworth Atheneum, Hartford, Connecticut)
- Jonathan Scott Hartley – Daguerre Memorial (Washington, D.C.)
- Martin Johnson Heade – Giant Magnolias on a Blue Velvet Cloth
- Ferdinand Hodler – Night (Kunstmuseum, Bern, Switzerland)
- Winslow Homer
  - Cloud Shadows
  - Summer Night
- Holman Hunt – May Morning on Magdalen Tower
- Fernand Khnopff – Silence
- P. S. and Marie Krøyer – Double portrait
- Henry Herbert La Thangue – Leaving Home
- Jules Joseph Lefebvre – Lady Godiva
- George Dunlop Leslie – Sun and Moon Flowers
- William Logsdail – The Ninth of November, 1888
- Princess Louise, Marchioness of Lorne – Statue of her mother Queen Victoria, at McGill University, Montreal
- Anna Lea Merritt – Love Locked Out
- Arturo Michelena – Lastenia Tello de Michelena
- John Everett Millais
  - Dew-Drenched Furze
  - Lingering Autumn
- Claude Monet – Boating on the River Epte
- Albert Joseph Moore – A Summer Night
- Edvard Munch – Night in Saint-Cloud
- Roderic O'Conor – La Lisiere du Bois
- Paul Peel – The Young Botanist
- Edward Poynter – The Visit of the Queen of Sheba to King Solomon
- Henrietta Rae – Ophelia
- Paul Ranson – Nabis Landscape
- Odilon Redon – With Closed Eyes (Musée d'Orsay, Paris)
- Frederic Remington – Aiding a Comrade
- William Blake Richmond – Venus and Anchises
- Tom Roberts – Shearing the Rams (National Gallery of Victoria)
- Auguste Rodin – Brother and Sister (bronze)
- Henri Rousseau – Myself, Portrait-Landscape
- Adalbert Seligmann – Theodor Billroth Operating (approximate date)
- Georges Seurat
  - Le Chahut
  - Young Woman Powdering Herself (Courtauld Institute of Art, London)
- Walter Sickert – Café des Tribunaux, Dieppe
- Paul Signac – Opus 217: Against the Enamel of a Background Rhythmic with Beats and Angles, Tones, and Tints, Portrait of M. Félix Fénéon in 1890
- Charles Alexander Smith – L'Assemblée des six-comtés
- Joseph-Noël Sylvestre – The Sack of Rome by the Barbarians in 410
- John Tenniel – Dropping the Pilot (political cartoon)
- James Tissot – Le rendez vous secret
- Henri de Toulouse-Lautrec – At the Moulin Rouge, The Dance

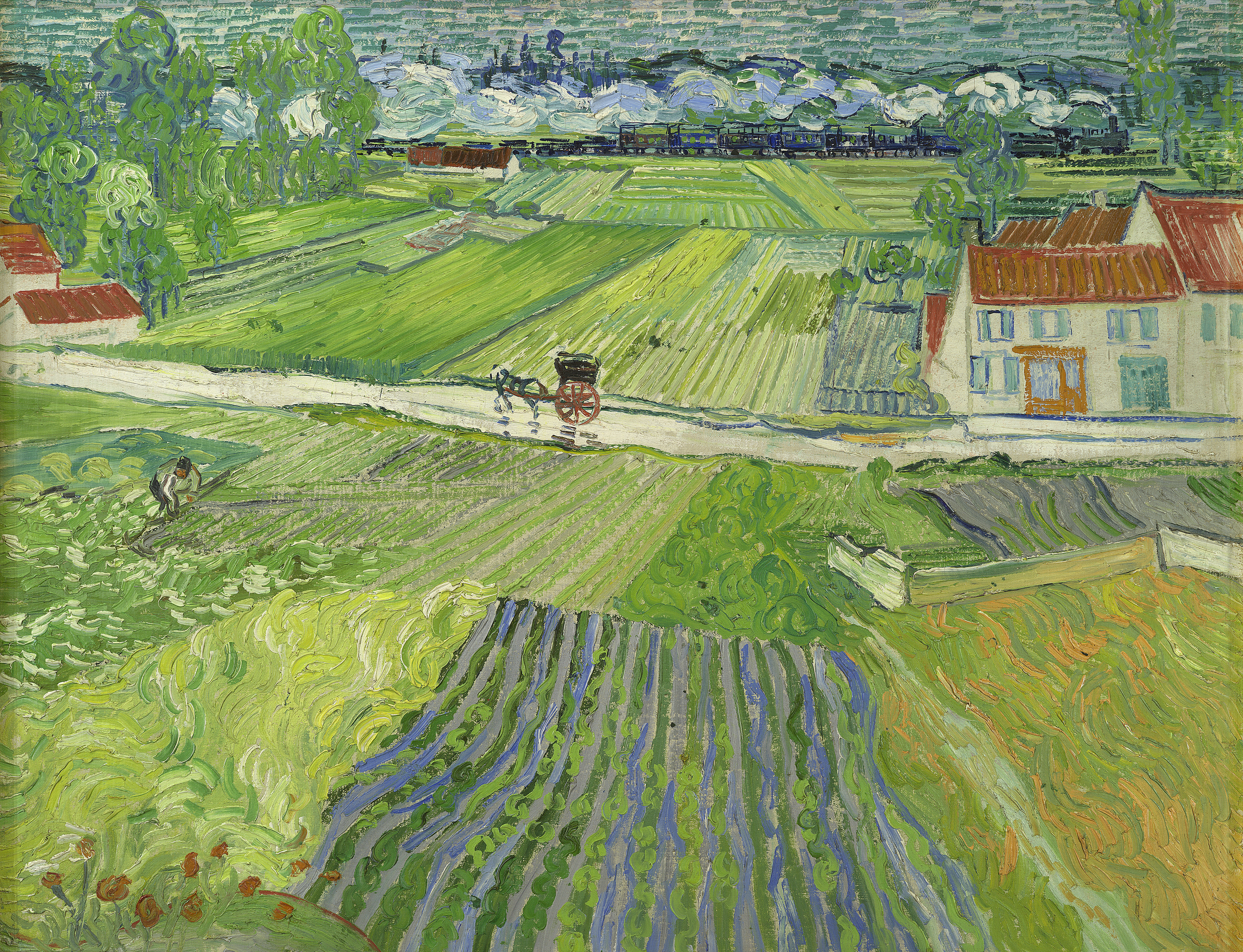
van Gogh's Landscape with a Carriage and a Train, painted in June 1890 (Pushkin Museum, Moscow (F760, JH2019))

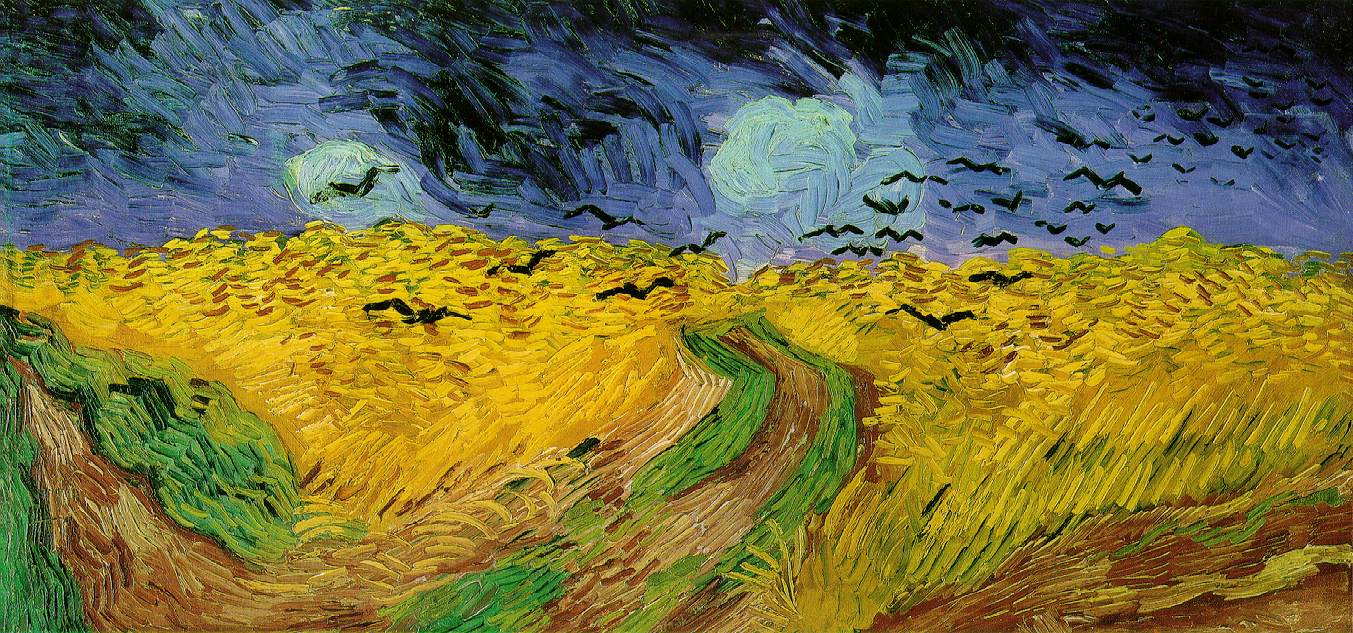
van Gogh's Wheatfield with Crows, painted in July 1890 during his last weeks (Van Gogh Museum, Amsterdam)

- Vincent van Gogh
  - Prisoners Exercising (February)
  - At Eternity's Gate (early May)
  - Road with Cypress and Star (early May)
  - Still Life: Vase with Pink Roses (by early May)
  - The Wheat Field, Sunrise (by early May)
  - Portrait of Dr. Gachet (two versions)
  - Doctor Gachet's Garden in Auvers
  - Marguerite Gachet in the Garden
  - Marguerite Gachet at the Piano
  - Daubigny's Garden (three versions, May–July)
  - Almond Blossoms
  - L'Arlésienne (four versions, February)
  - The Church at Auvers (June)
  - Houses at Auvers (June)
  - Houses in Auvers
  - Street in Auvers
  - Thatched Cottages and Houses (May)
  - White House at Night (June 16)
  - Thatched Cottages by a Hill (July)
  - Farms near Auvers (July)
  - The Town Hall at Auvers (July)
  - Landscape with Castle Auvers at Sunset (June)
  - Old Vineyard with Peasant Woman (brush drawing, May)
  - Girl in White
  - Peasant Woman Against a Background of Wheat (June)
  - Landscape with a Carriage and a Train (June)
  - Landscape at Auvers in the Rain (July)
  - Poppies and Butterflies (April–May) and Long Grass with Butterflies (May) from his Butterflies series
  - Tree Roots (July)
  - Tree Trunks in the Grass
  - Undergrowth with Two Figures (late June)
  - Wheat Fields series
    - Field with Green Wheat
    - Wheat Field at Auvers with white house (June)
    - Ears of Wheat (June)
    - Wheat Fields near Auvers (June–July)
    - Wheat Fields with Auvers in the Background (July)
    - The Fields (July)
    - Wheat Field with Cornflowers (July)
    - Wheat Fields after the Rain (The Plain of Auvers) (July)
    - Wheat Stack Under Clouded Sky (July)
    - Field with Stacks of Grain (July)
    - Sheaves of Wheat
    - Harvest near Auvers
    - Wheatfield with Crows (July)
    - Wheatfield Under Thunderclouds (July)
    - Sheaves of Wheat
    - Field with Stacks of Grain (July)
  - Copies
    - Cows (after Jordaens)
    - First Steps (after Millet)
    - The Good Samaritan (after Delacroix)
    - Men Drinking (after Daumier)
    - Morning: Peasant Couple Going to Work (after Millet)
    - Noon – Rest from Work (after Millet)
    - Snow covered Field with a Harrow (after Millet) (January)
    - Two Peasant Women Digging in the Snow (after Millet) (April)
    - The Woodcutter (after Millet)
    - The Raising of Lazarus (after Rembrandt)
- George Frederic Watts
  - The All-Pervading
  - Little Red Riding Hood (Birmingham Museum and Art Gallery)
- J. B. B. Wellington – Eventide (photogravure)
- William R. Coats – Ypsilanti Water Tower (Ypsilanti, Michigan), winner of Most Phallic Building contest (2003)

== Awards ==
- Grand Prix de Rome, painting: (unknown).
- Grand Prix de Rome, sculpture: Paul-Jean-Baptiste Gasq.
- Grand Prix de Rome, architecture: Emmanuel Pontremoli.
- Grand Prix de Rome, music: (unknown).

== Births ==
=== January to June ===
- January 7 – Milton Menasco, American painter and art director (died 1974)
- January 14 – Petar Dobrović, Serbian Expressionist painter (died 1942)
- February 14 – Nina Hamnett, Welsh-born painter, model and designer (died 1956)
- March 17 – LeMoine Fitzgerald, painter (died 1956)
- April 14 – Gerald Curtis Delano, American painter (died 1972)
- April 21 – Dod Procter (born Doris Shaw), English painter (died 1972)
- May 4 – Franklin Carmichael, painter (died 1945)
- June 12 – Egon Schiele, painter (died 1918)
- June 20 – Giorgio Morandi, painter and printmaker (died 1964)
- June 29 – Robert Laurent, American sculptor (died 1970)

=== July to December ===
- July 4 – Jacques Carlu, French architect and designer (died 1976)
- July 28
  - Grace Albee, American printmaker (died 1985)
  - Pinchus Kremegne, Belarusian sculptor, painter and lithographer (died 1981)
- August 5 – Naum Gabo, Russian sculptor (died 1977)
- September 10 – Elsa Schiaparelli, Italian fashion designer (died 1973)
- September 19 – Montague Dawson, English maritime painter (died 1973)
- September 22 – Ze'ev Raban, Polish Jewish painter (died 1970)
- September 24 – Doris Brabham Hatt, English modernist painter (died 1969)
- October 6 – Phyllis Gardner, British graphic artist and dog breeder, beloved of Rupert Brooke (died 1939)
- October 16 – Paul Strand, American photographer and filmmaker (died 1976)
- November 21 – Jeanne Mammen, German painter (died 1976)
- November 23 – El Lissitzky, Russian designer, architect and photographer (died 1941)
- November 25 – Isaac Rosenberg, British poet and painter (died 1918)
- December 5 – David Bomberg, British painter (died 1957)
- December 6 – Rudolf Schlichter, German painter (died 1955)
- December 11 – Mark Tobey, American abstract expressionist painter (died 1976)
- December 25 – Leon Underwood, English sculptor (died 1975).

=== Full date unknown ===
- Jean Xceron, Greek-American painter (died 1967)

== Deaths ==
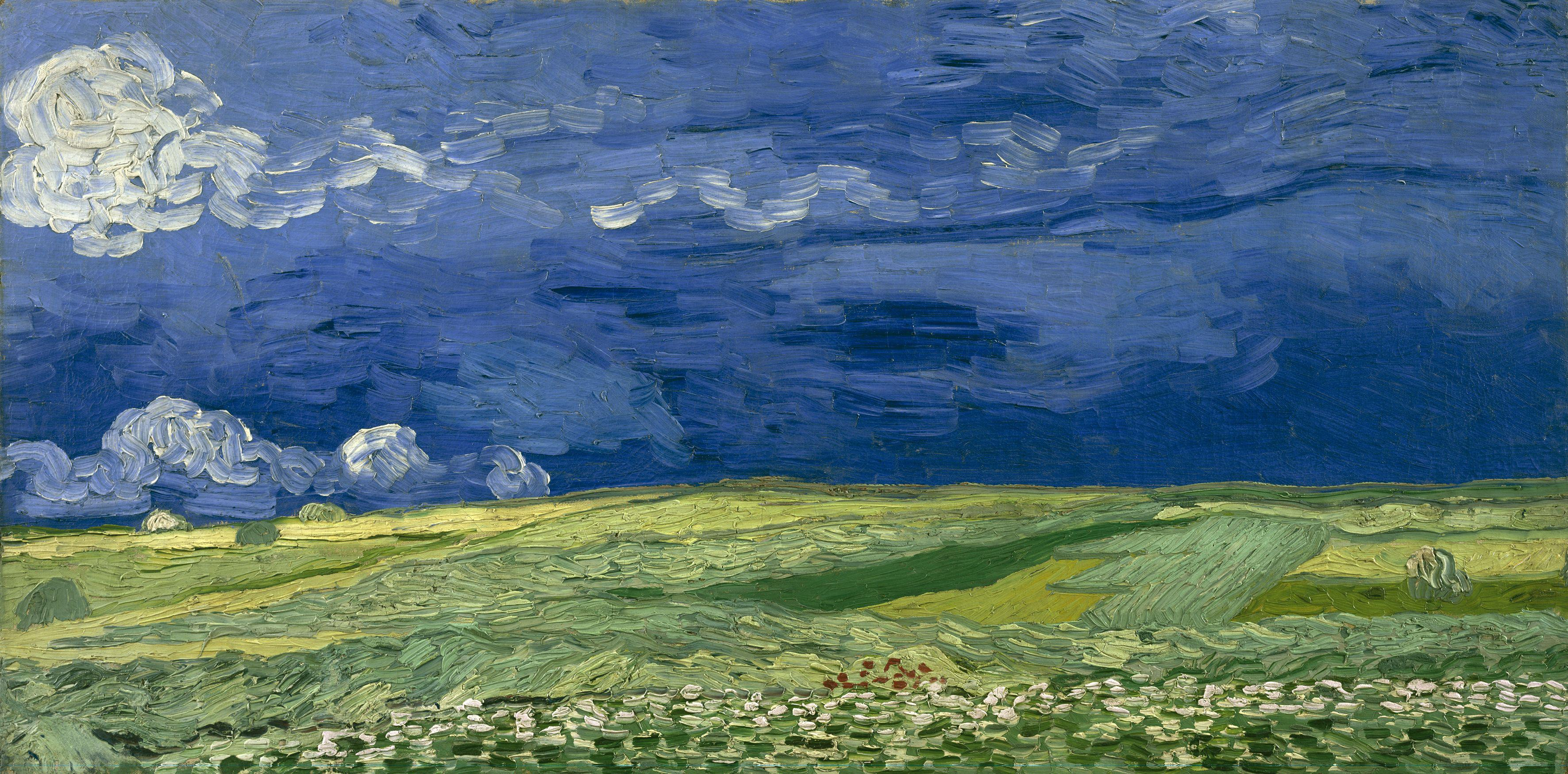
van Gogh's Wheatfield Under Thunderclouds, painted in July 1890 during his last weeks (Van Gogh Museum, Amsterdam F778)

- January 25 – Antonio Salviati, Italian glassmaker (born 1816)
- March 17 – John Rogers Herbert, English religious painter (born 1810)
- April 21 – Charles Augustus Howell, British art dealer (born 1840)
- May 5 – Joseph-Nicolas Robert-Fleury, French painter (born 1797)
- May 9 – Friedrich Loos, Austrian Biedermeier style painter, etcher and lithographer (born 1797)
- May 24 – Georgiana McCrae, Australian painter (born 1804)
- July 11 – Novak Radonić, Serbian painter (born 1826)
- July 20 – Sir Richard Wallace, 1st Baronet, English francophile art collector and philanthropist (born 1818)
- July 29 – Vincent van Gogh, Dutch painter (born 1853)
- August 18 – Albert Dubois-Pillet, French Neo-impressionist painter (born 1846)
- August 21 – Charles West Cope, English painter (born 1811)
- August 30 – Marianne North, English botanical artist (born 1830)
- December 12 – Sir Joseph Boehm, sculptor (born 1834) (dies in his London home in the presence of his pupil Princess Louise, Marchioness of Lorne)
- December 13 – François Bocion, Swiss painter (born 1828)
- December 18 – Gerolamo Induno, Italian painter (born 1825)
- December 19 – Eugène Lami, French painter and lithographer (born 1800)
- date unknown
  - John Lewis Brown, French painter (born 1829)
  - Auguste Ottin, French sculptor (born 1811)
  - Pietro Pezzati, Italian mural painter (born 1828)
