= Wheatfield Under Thunderclouds =

Painting by Vincent van Gogh

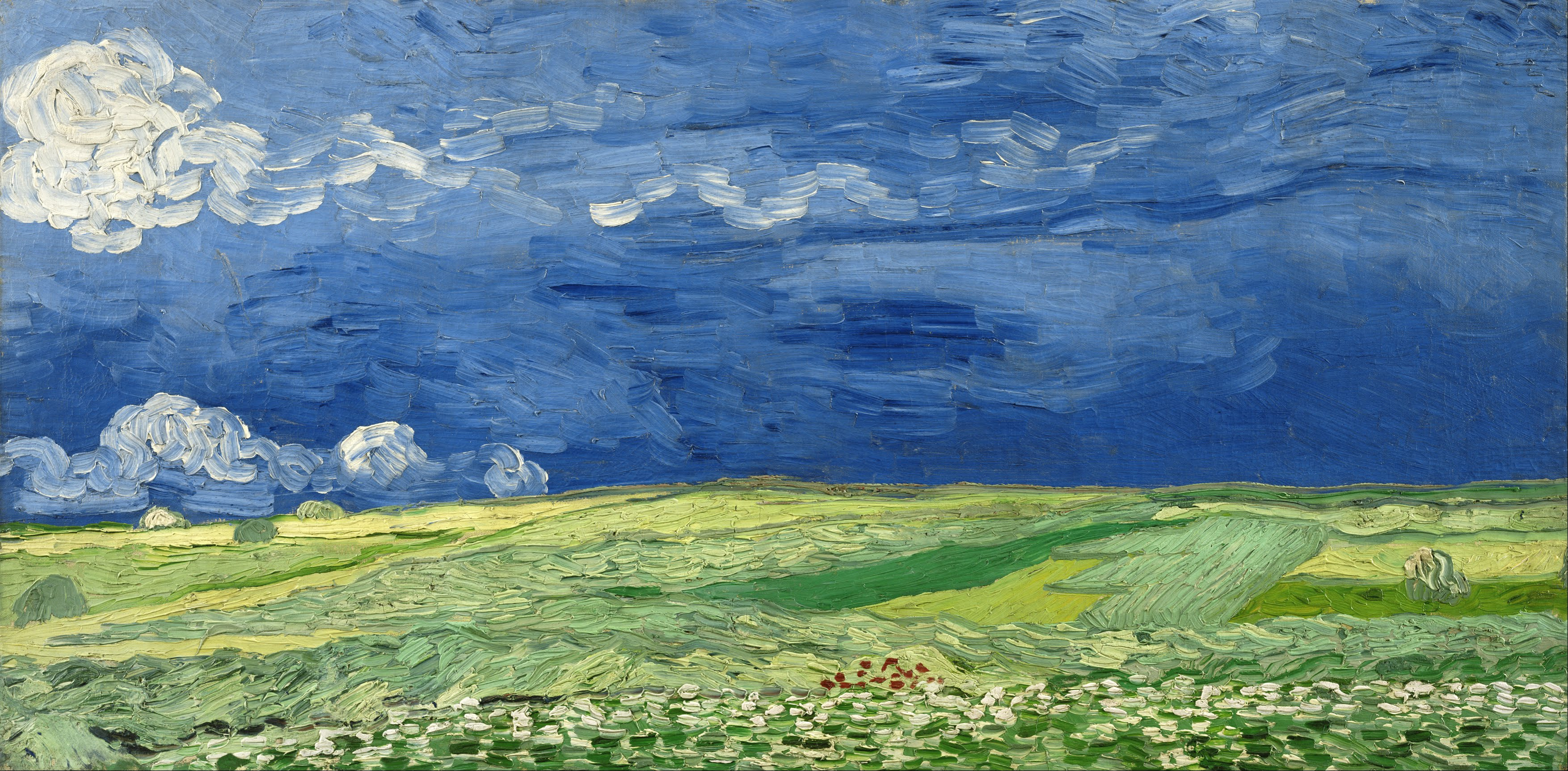
- Artist: Vincent van Gogh
- Year: 1890
- Catalogue: F778; JH2097
- Dimensions: 50.4 cm × 101.3 cm (19.8 in × 39.9 in)
- Location: Van Gogh Museum, Amsterdam, Netherlands

Wheatfield Under Thunderclouds (in Dutch, Korenveld onder onweerslucht) is an 1890 oil painting by Vincent van Gogh. The painting measures 50.4 cm × 101.3 cm (19.8 in × 39.9 in). It depicts a relatively flat and featureless landscape with fields of green wheat, under a foreboding dark blue sky with a few heavy white clouds. The horizon divides the work almost into two, with shades of green and yellow below and shades of blue and white above. Since 1973 it has been on permanent loan to the Van Gogh Museum in Amsterdam.

This very late work was painted in early July 1890, just a few weeks before Van Gogh's death. It was one of several paintings of wheat fields that he made in Auvers-sur-Oise, in an unusually elongated double-square format: other examples include Wheatfield with Crows (F779) and Landscape at Auvers in the Rain (F811).

In a letter of around 10 July 1890, Van Gogh wrote to his brother Theo and sister-in-law Jo that he had already painted three large canvases at Auvers since visiting them in Paris on 6 July. One of the three paintings was Daubigny's Garden (F777). The other two he described as "immense stretches of wheatfields under turbulent skies" – probably this painting and Wheatfield with Crows – in which he was "trying to express sadness, extreme loneliness" (immenses étendues de blés sous des ciels troublés … chercher à exprimer de la tristesse, de la solitude extreme). He added that he intended to take them to Paris as soon as possible, as "these canvases will tell you what I can’t say in words, what I consider healthy and fortifying about the countryside" (j'espère vous les apporter à Paris le plus tôt possible … ces toiles vous diront ce que je ne sais dire en paroles, ce que je vois de sain et de fortifiant dans la campagne).

Van Gogh shot himself on 27 July and died in Auvers on 29 July 1890, by which time the three paintings were already with Theo van Gogh in Paris. On Theo's death in January 1891 they were inherited by his widow Johanna van Gogh-Bonger. She loaned the painting to the Rijksmuseum in Amsterdam from 1917 to 1919. After her death in 1925 it was inherited by Theo and Jo's son Vincent Willem van Gogh. It was transferred to the Vincent van Gogh Foundation (Vincent van Gogh Stichting) in 1962, and displayed at the Stedelijk Museum until 1973, then on permanent loan to the Van Gogh Museum in Amsterdam (known as the Rijksmuseum Vincent van Gogh until 1994).

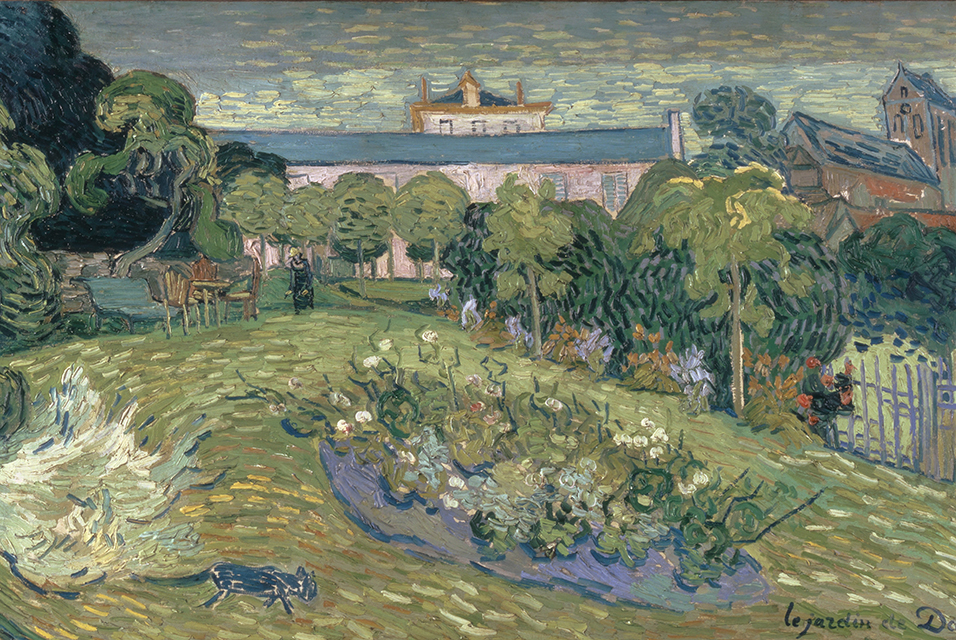
Daubigny's Garden (F777), Kunstmuseum Basel

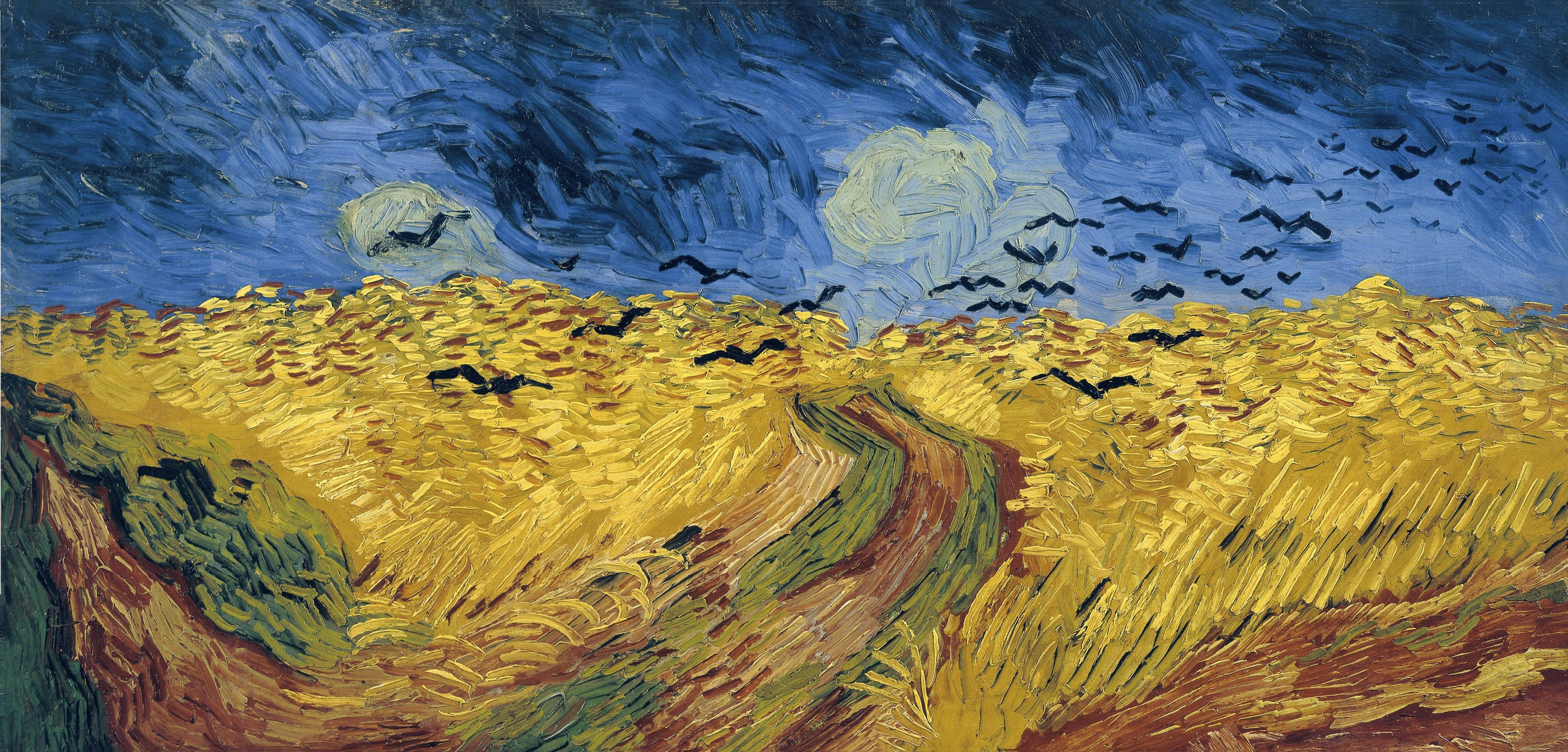
Wheatfield with Crows (F779), Van Gogh Museum, Amsterdam

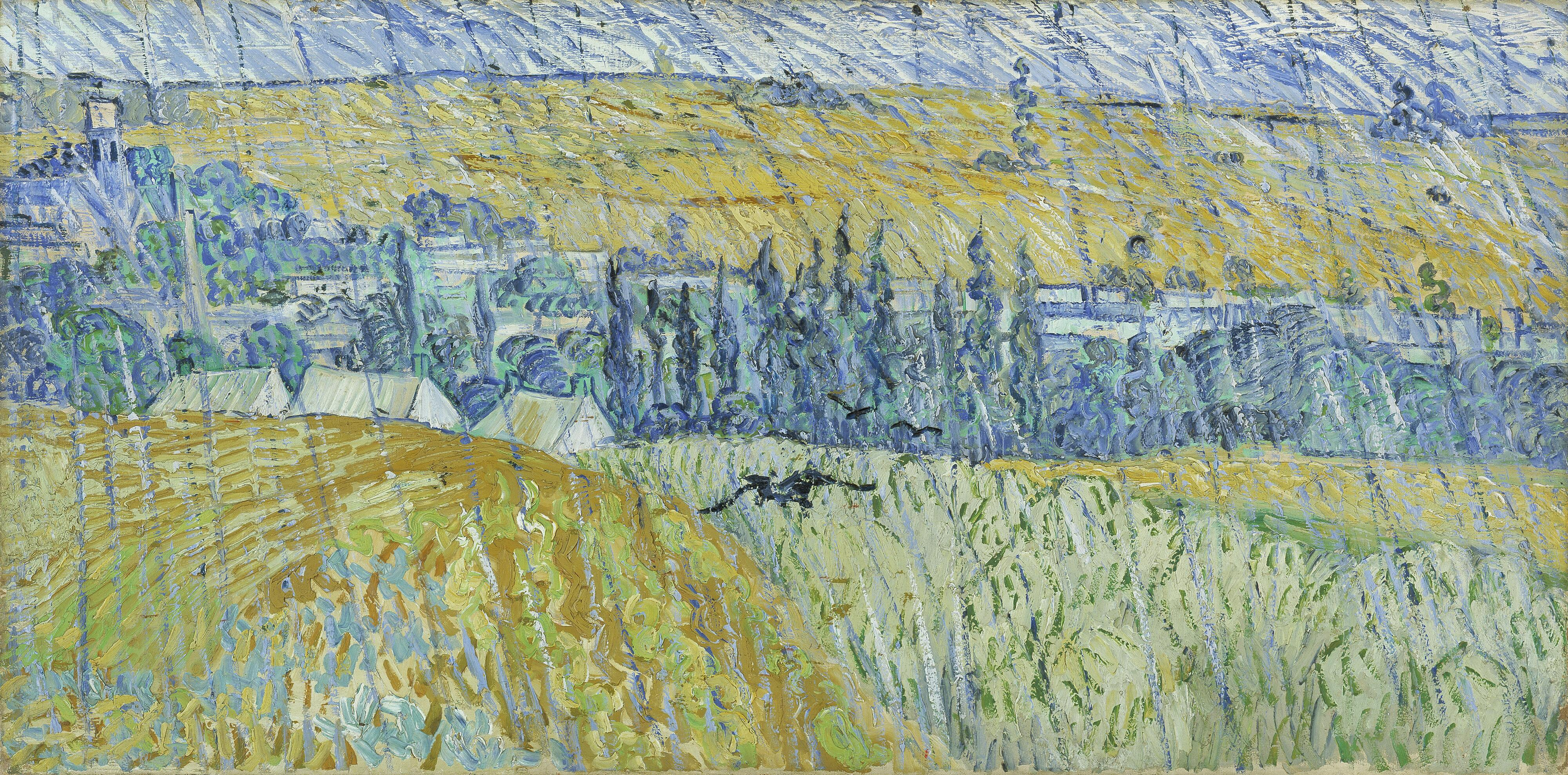
Landscape at Auvers in the Rain (F811), National Museum Cardiff

== See also ==
- List of works by Vincent van Gogh
