= Wheatfield with Crows =

1890 painting by Vincent van Gogh

Coordinates: 52°21′30″N 4°52′52″E

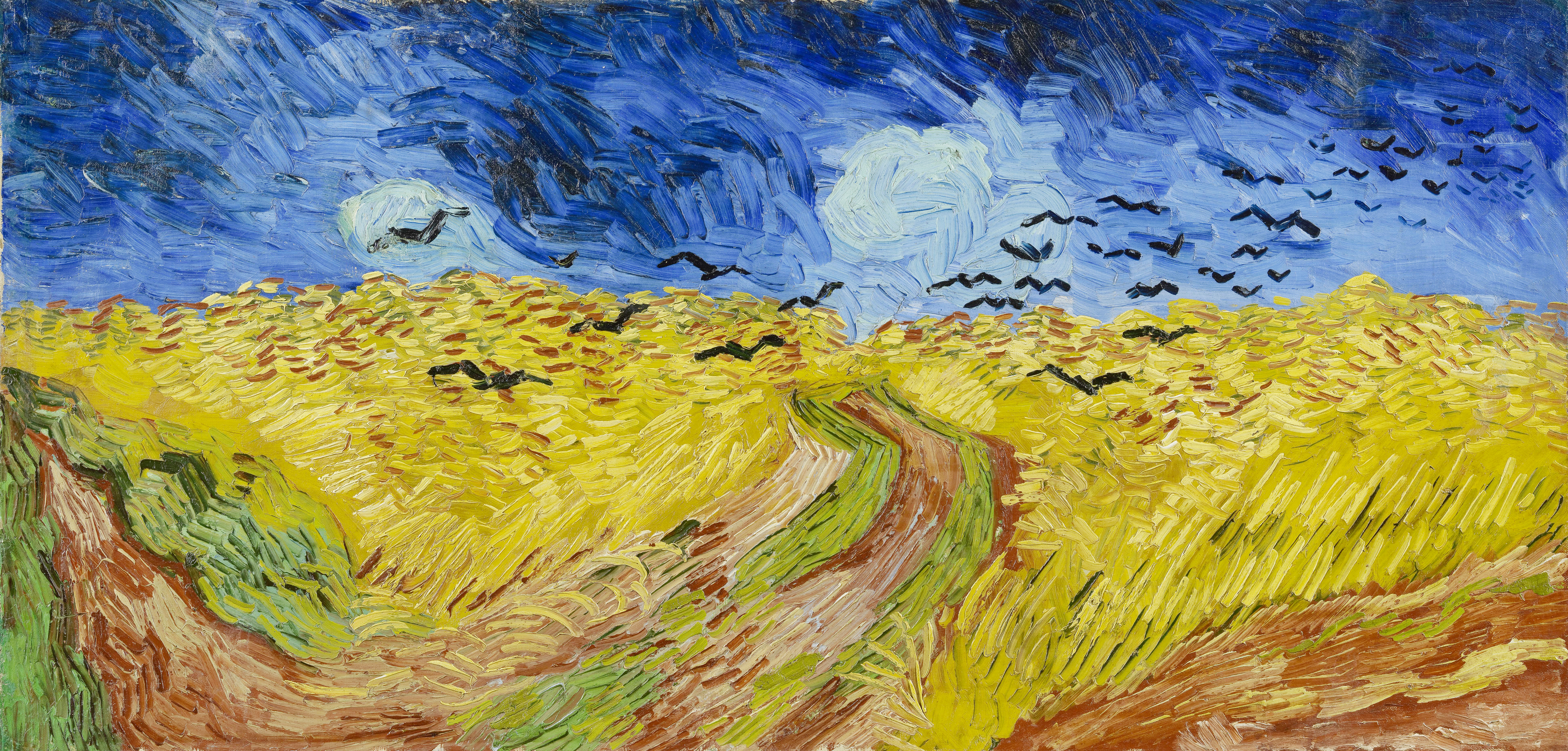
- An 1890 Van Gogh painting of a wheat field with crows flying above
- Artist: Vincent van Gogh
- Year: July 1890
- Catalogue: F779; JH2117
- Medium: Oil on canvas
- Dimensions: 50.2 cm × 103 cm (19.8 in × 41 in)
- Location: Van Gogh Museum, Amsterdam

Wheatfield with Crows (Dutch: Korenveld met kraaien) is a July 1890 painting by Vincent van Gogh. It has been cited by several critics as one of his greatest works.

It is commonly stated that this was Van Gogh's final painting. This association was popularized by Vincente Minnelli’s 1956 biopic Lust for Life, which depicts Van Gogh painting it immediately before shooting himself. His final painting in actuality was Tree Roots. The evidence of his letters suggests that Wheatfield with Crows was completed around 10 July and predates such paintings as Auvers Town Hall on 14 July 1890 and Daubigny's Garden. Moreover, Jan Hulsker has written that a painting of harvested wheat, Field with Stacks of Wheat (F771), must be a later painting.

== Provenance ==
The Van Gogh Museum's Wheatfield with Crows was painted in July 1890, in the last weeks of Van Gogh's life. Many have claimed it as his last painting, while it is likely that Tree Roots was his final painting.

Wheat Field with Crows, made on a double-square canvas, depicts a dramatic, cloudy sky filled with crows over a wheat field. A sense of isolation is heightened by a central path leading nowhere and by the uncertain direction of flight of the crows. The windswept wheat field fills two-thirds of the canvas. Jules Michelet, one of van Gogh's favorite authors, wrote of crows: "They interest themselves in everything, and observe everything. The ancients, who lived far more completely than ourselves in and with nature, found it no small profit to follow, in a hundred obscure things where human experience as yet affords no light, the directions of so prudent and sage a bird." Kathleen Erickson finds the painting as expressing both sorrow and a sense of his life coming to an end. The crows are used by van Gogh as a symbol of death and rebirth, or of resurrection. The road, in contrasting colors of red and green, is said by Erickson to be a metaphor for a sermon he gave based on Bunyan's The Pilgrim's Progress where the pilgrim is sorrowful that the road is so long, yet rejoices because the Eternal City waits at the journey's end.

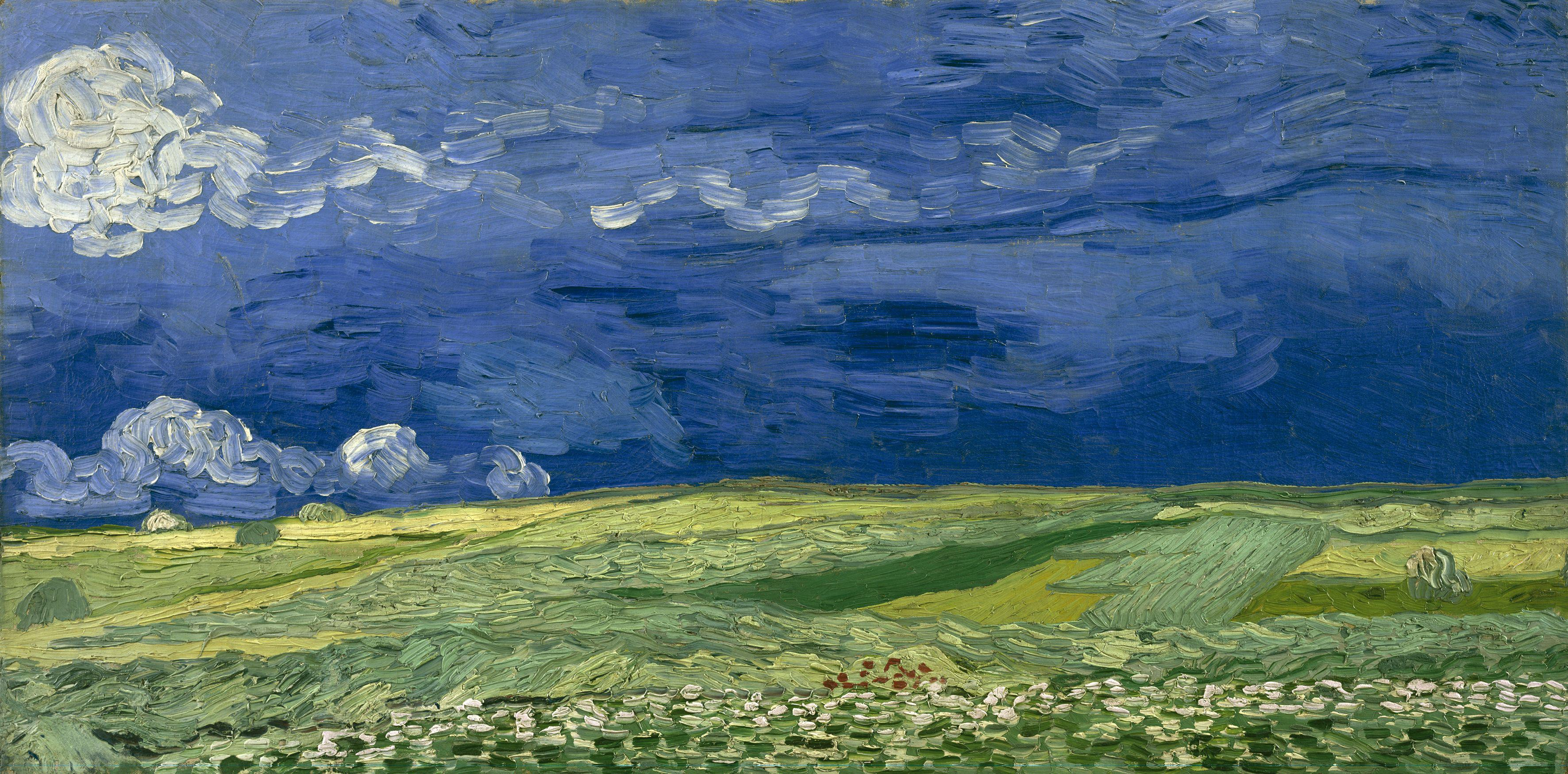
Wheatfield Under Thunderclouds (1890)

About 10 July 1890 Van Gogh wrote to his brother Theo and his wife Jo Bonger, saying that he had painted another three large canvases at Auvers since visiting them in Paris on 6 July. Two of these are described as immense stretches of wheatfields under turbulent skies, thought to be Wheatfield under Clouded Sky and Wheatfield with Crows, and the third is Daubigny's Garden. He wrote that he had made a point of expressing sadness, later adding "extreme loneliness" (de la solitude extrême), but also says he believes the canvases show what he considers healthy and fortifying about the countryside (and adds that he intended to take them to Paris as soon as possible).

Walther and Metzger, in Van Gogh: The Complete Paintings, state that "There is nothing in Van Gogh's words to support a simplistic interpretation along the lines of artistic angst and despair – nor is there any evidence for the widely-held belief that it was this painting that Van Gogh had on his easel at the time he killed himself." They refer to a June 1880 letter of van Gogh's, in which he compared himself to a bird in a cage, and remark: "The crows in the painting, in other words, were an altogether personal symbol closely associated with van Gogh's own life".

These painting are all examples of Van Gogh's elongated double-square canvases, used exclusively by him in the last few weeks of his life, in June and July 1890.

The painting is held in the collection of the Van Gogh Museum in Amsterdam, as is Wheatfield under Clouded Sky.

Wheatfield with Crows was stolen and quickly recovered in 1991 along with 19 other Van Gogh paintings; the painting was "severely damaged" during the heist.

The Indonesian composer Ananda Sukarlan composed a piece with the same title for flute and piano inspired by this and three other paintings, under a cycle titled "The Springs of Vincent".

== See also ==
- List of works by Vincent van Gogh
- For other paintings of wheat fields by Van Gogh see Wheat Fields (Van Gogh series).
- For Joan Mitchell's 1987 painting No Birds, a homage to Wheatfield with Crows, see her article Joan Mitchell.
