= Landscape with a Carriage and a Train =

1890 oil painting by Vincent van Gogh

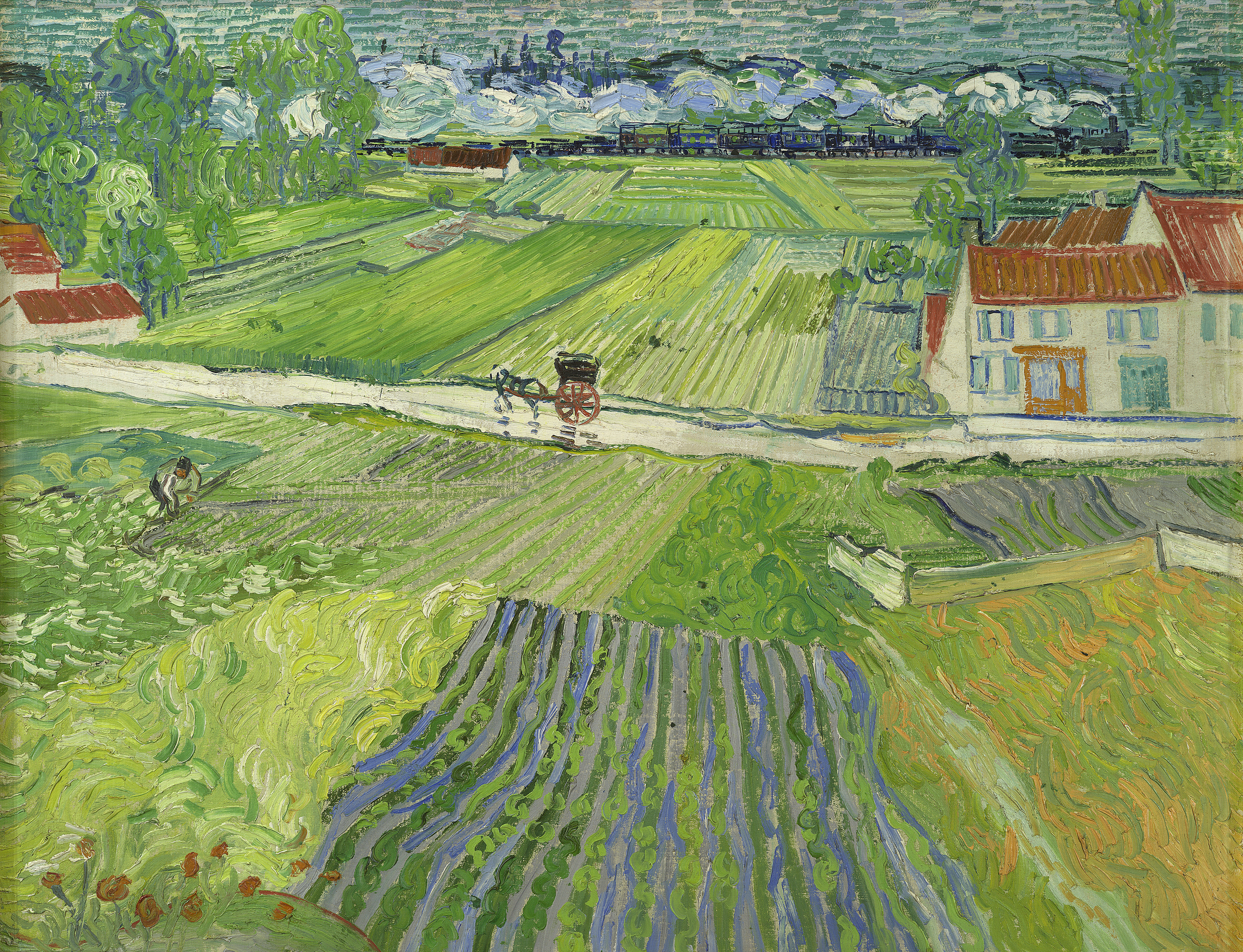
- Artist: Vincent van Gogh
- Year: June 1890
- Catalogue: F760; JH2019
- Medium: Oil on canvas
- Dimensions: 72 cm × 90 cm (28 in × 35 in)
- Location: Pushkin Museum, Moscow

Landscape with a Carriage and a Train also known as Landscape at Auvers after Rain is an oil painting by Vincent van Gogh that he painted in June 1890 when he lived in Auvers-sur-Oise, France.

== Background ==
Van Gogh spent the last few months of his life in Auvers-sur-Oise, a small town just north of Paris, after he left an asylum at Saint-Rémy in May 1890. He made the painting in the week following his portraits of Dr. Gachet. The viewpoint from above was a favourite perspective of his since his days sketching in the dunes of Scheveningen at The Hague with the aid of a perspective frame.

Van Gogh described the painting in a letter to his sister Wil:

Lately I’ve been working a lot and quickly; by doing so I’m trying to express the desperately swift passage of things in modern life.

Yesterday in the rain I painted a large landscape viewed from a height in which there are fields as far as the eye can see, different types of greenery, a dark green field of potatoes, between the regular plants the lush, violet earth, a field of peas in flower whitening to the side, a field of pink-flowered lucerne with a small figure of a reaper, a field of long, ripe grass, fawn in hue, then wheatfields, poplars, a last line of blue hills on the horizon, at the bottom of which a train is passing, leaving behind it an immense trail of white smoke in the greenery. A white road crosses the canvas. On the road a little carriage and white houses with stark red roofs beside this road. Fine rain streaks the whole with blue or grey lines

The painting is in the collection of the Pushkin Museum of Fine Arts, Moscow.

== See also ==
- Landscape at Auvers in the Rain
- List of works by Vincent van Gogh

== Bibliography ==
- de la Faille, Jacob-Baart. The Works of Vincent van Gogh: His Paintings and Drawings. Amsterdam: Meulenhoff, 1970. ISBN 978-1-55660-811-7
- Hulsker, Jan. The Complete Van Gogh. Oxford: Phaidon, 1980. ISBN 0-7148-2028-8
- Naifeh, Steven; Smith, Gregory White. Van Gogh: The Life. Profile Books, 2011. ISBN 978-1-84668-010-6
- van der Veen, Wouter; Knapp, Peter. Van Gogh in Auvers: His Last Days. Monacelli Press, 2010. ISBN 978-1-58093-301-8
