= Landscape at Auvers in the Rain =

1890 painting by Vincent van Gogh

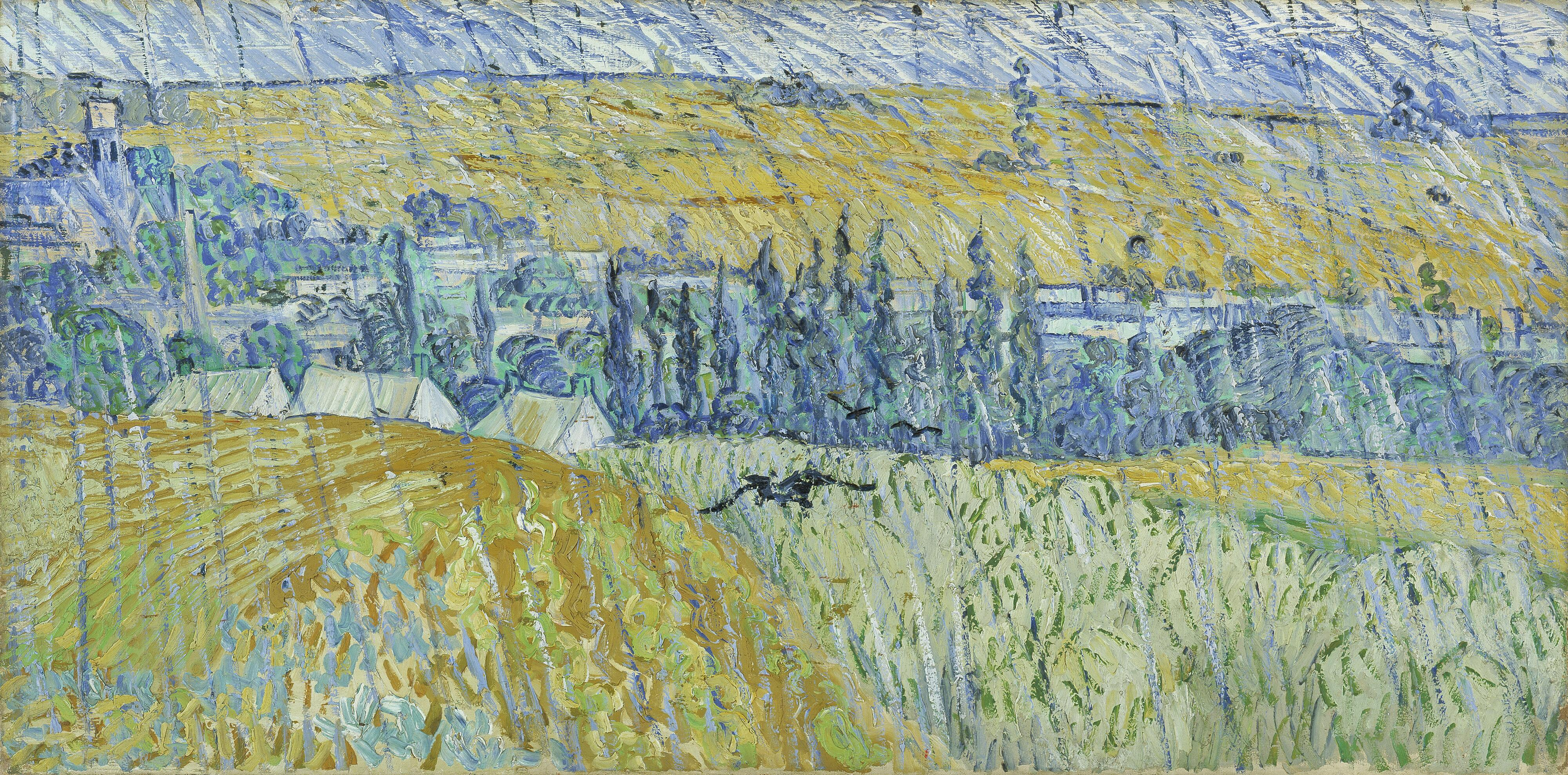
- Artist: Vincent van Gogh
- Year: 1890
- Catalogue: F 811/JH 2096
- Medium: Oil on canvas
- Dimensions: 50 cm × 100 cm (19.685 in × 39.3701 in)
- Location: National Museum Cardiff

Landscape at Auvers in the Rain is an oil painting on canvas by the Dutch Post-Impressionist painter Vincent van Gogh.

Painted in July 1890, and completed just three days before his death, it depicts a landscape at Auvers-sur-Oise, where van Gogh spent the last 70 days of his life. It is one of thirteen double-square canvases of landscapes around Auvers completed by van Gogh between 17 June and 27 July. The depiction of the rain with dark, diagonal lines is considered to be inspired by Japanese art, specifically the woodcuts of Hiroshige. It also displays the visceral relationship between nature and emotion that is a trademark of van Gogh's later work, as well as the stylistic innovations of a raised horizon line, expressive brushstrokes, and bold colours. This was one of Van Gogh's last paintings before his death and has been interpreted as symbolizing the cycle of human suffering contrasted with a sense of hope. The painting was bought by Gwendoline Davies in 1920 in Paris, and was donated to the National Museum of Wales in Cardiff as part of her bequest in 1952.

== Background ==
Vincent van Gogh became an artist at the age of 27, and continued painting until his alleged suicide on 29 July 1890 at the age of 37. Originally based in his home country of the Netherlands, van Gogh spent the last four years of life painting in France, where his greatest artistic innovation occurred. As his mental health declined, allegedly due to an epileptic disorder, van Gogh chose to enter a private asylum in Saint-Remy-de-Provence in the South of France. He spent fifteen months there, continuing to develop a distinct artistic style. Then, he moved to the small village of Auvers-sur-Oise in northern France, where he spent the last three months of his life.

Van Gogh lived in Auvers from May to 27 July 1890. In those seventy days, the artist painted over seventy works, enjoying his newfound autonomy after being institutionalised by producing art fanatically. His main correspondences were with his brother Theo van Gogh, to whom he wrote in Paris, and Doctor Paul Gachet, a local homoeopathic practitioner who was interested in Post-Impressionist art and who kept an eye on the artist. Despite his renewed freedom, van Gogh's mental health continued to deteriorate, leading to his suicide. In the last two months of his life, the artist engaged in his "most daring stylistic experiments and freed himself from any remaining academic constraints, which had still hampered his work in the previous months". Notably, he painted twelve double-square canvases of the gardens and fields around Auvers in the last ten days of his life, which displayed some of his most innovative techniques in terms of colour and composition. Landscape at Auvers in the Rain was part of this collection of works, which were probably meant to be a coherent series, and was painted within the last three days before his suicide.

== Development ==
=== Setting ===
Twenty miles northwest of Paris, Auvers was a popular artist colony "discovered" by the Barbizon painter Charles-François Daubigny, who lived there in the 1870s. The village attracted those engaged in the Impressionist movement due to its tranquility and the contrast between its natural environment and the nearby capital city. An influential art colony for 30 years, Auvers provided rich landscapes as well as a sharp contrast between the old, quaint cottages and new industrial features, such as the railway. In Auvers, van Gogh painted portraits, villages, and fields, focusing more on the natural beauty and provincial village life than the new mechanical innovations. Van Gogh largely edited out any signs of industrialisation because he was "more interested in finding a new way of painting traditional motifs – whether through achieving a particular effect of light, or through the expressive use of colour – than recording the encroachment of modern life". Therefore, in Landscape at Auvers in the Rain, van Gogh chose to focus on the old-world charm of the village, from the shaped thatched roofs of the houses to the old cottages, and the natural beauty of Auvers, from the bustling meadows to the dark trees.

Environmentally, Auvers contrasted significantly with Southern France, leading van Gogh to develop new styles to convey his evolving relationship with the novel natural features of the land, reflecting the transition from the hot and dry climate of the South to the "cooler, rainy weather in the north that nourished gardens in Auvers". The climate inspired him to capture the falling rain in Landscape at Auvers in the Rain, but it also revived him on a spiritual level, as he wrote that in Auvers there was "beautiful greenery in abundance" and that it was "far enough from Paris ... to be in the real countryside" with a sense of "well-being in the air". The new location also inspired shifts in artistic technique, as van Gogh explored a heightened palette of bright greens and yellows, expressive brushwork, and innovative compositions, creating some of his most daring works. The precise location was identified by expert Wouter van der Veen: the painter set up his easel on the hills of Méry-sur-Oise, south of Auvers. The section Van Gogh depicted is the eastern part of the village, from the church to the hamlet of Cordeville. It is the only painting of the Dutch master's last period that was not made in the village itself.

=== Influences ===
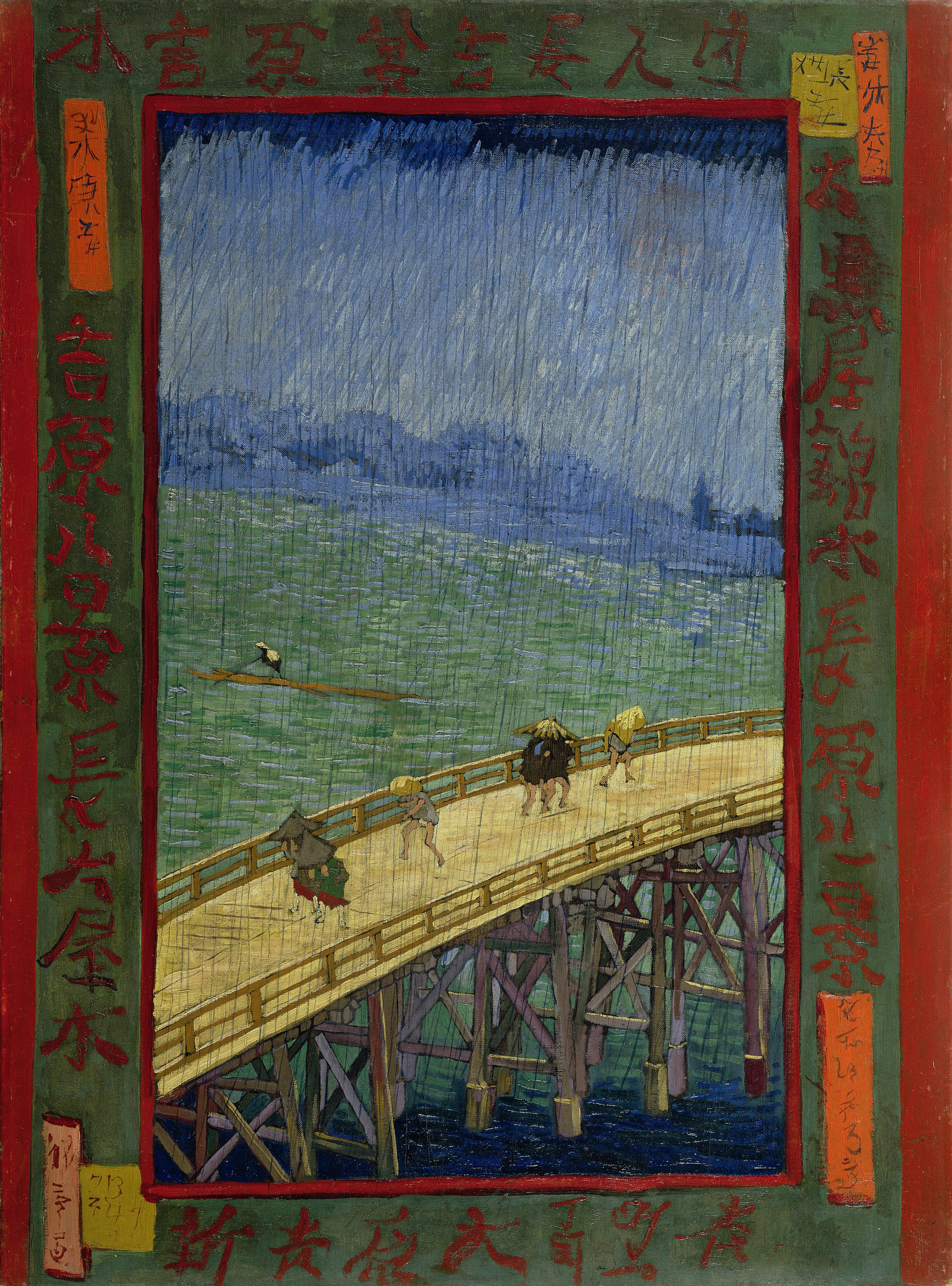
Bridge in the Rain (After Hiroshige), Vincent van Gogh, oil on canvas, 1887, a source of inspiration for Landscape at Auvers in the Rain

For Landscape at Auvers in the Rain, van Gogh drew inspiration from both French and Japanese art, creating a distinctly personal style. Originally a "peasant painter" who emulated the Dutch greats, van Gogh shifted from dark, sombre hues to embracing the vibrant colours of the Post-Impressionist movement. Once he moved to France, van Gogh drew inspiration from the works of innovators such as Monet, Pissarro, and Seurat, and began to experiment with brushstroke and colour, emulating the Impressionist and Pointillist styles in his paintings. Importantly, van Gogh was heavily influenced by his fellow Post-Impressionist artist Gauguin, with whom he connected over their shared "submission of nature to the expression of emotion in their works". Entering his Auvers period, van Gogh, due to his lack of self-confidence and faltering faith in artistic innovation, also sought inspiration from the older generation of French artists such as Delacroix and Daubigny. In particular, his choice of the double-square format was inspired by Daubigny, "who had a strong predilection for canvases that were twice as wide as they were high, ideal for picturing sweeping landscapes". Due to Theo's extensive collection of Japanese art, Vincent was also highly influenced by art from Japan and the Japonisme movement. In Landscape at Auvers in the Rain, van Gogh uses dark, diagonal strokes to represent rain, a technique directly influenced by the woodcut Sudden Shower over Shin-Ōhashi Bridge and Atake by the Japanese artist Hiroshige, which he copied for training in 1887. Through his varied sources of inspiration, van Gogh "wanted somehow to combine past and present, North and South, Rembrandt and Delacroix, Europe and the Far East".

== Composition ==
Van Gogh's exploration of 50 cm × 100 cm (20 in × 39 in), double-square canvases allowed him to convey the fields surrounding Auvers with a greater sense of boundlessness. In his final letter to Theo he expressed that he was "quite absorbed in the immense plain with wheatfields against the hills" he found in Auvers, a sense of awe he wished to display in his paintings. The artist created twelve landscapes of this size but, curiously, "van Gogh himself said nothing about why he began using these unusual formats", although "the paintings were probably envisioned as a series to be hung and exhibited together". Landscape at Auvers in the Rain is a prime example of how these large canvases afforded him an expanse to represent the immense stretches of wheatfields that engulfed the village. He engages the viewer by illustrating a high horizon line, creating a bird's-eye view, but tilting the foreground so that one feels oneself to be within the grassy hills and looking above them simultaneously. The image has a limitless, panoramic depth due to the artist's "diametrically opposed compositional approach, an exaggerated wide-angle effect from an elevated vantage point, giving a remarkably broad view over the landscape." Van Gogh's use of perspective and cropping became bolder and more innovative as he progressed as an artist, especially noteworthy because Landscape at Auvers in the Rain is one of his final works, showing that he continued to evolve the entirety of his career. Fascinated with this striking perspective, graphic design researchers have used digital analysis on Landscape at Auvers in the Rain, among other works from the artist's Auvers period, determining that "in Auvers, van Gogh moved toward simplifying the composition, trading it for an increase in contrast and chromaticity".

== Interpretations ==
=== Subject ===
Landscape of Auvers in the Rain portrays the town of Auvers as well as the wheatfields that surround it. The view looks at the village from the perspective of a trail that cuts through the cemetery and fields surrounding the town. Notably, the houses of Auvers appear half sunken into the landscape surrounding the town, emphasising the natural world over the provincial town, as the buildings "rhyme with the diagonals of the hillsides outside their doors" bleeding into the countryside. Furthermore, it is notable that van Gogh chose not to populate the town in this image, largely erasing any form of topography or narrative. This leaves the viewer with the saturated, abstracted features of the sky, hills, town, and fields without a context, forcing them to confront van Gogh's intense brushstrokes and colours. However, critics note that "the loss of the particularity does not lead to mere pattern but to an unprecedented emphasis on the brute facts of the landscape and the viewer’s visceral relationship to it", revealing that by choosing to portray a town's close relationship to nature through an expressive, abstracted perspective, van Gogh is able to create a more unique, emotionally-engaging landscape than if he merely copied Auvers for artistic accuracy.

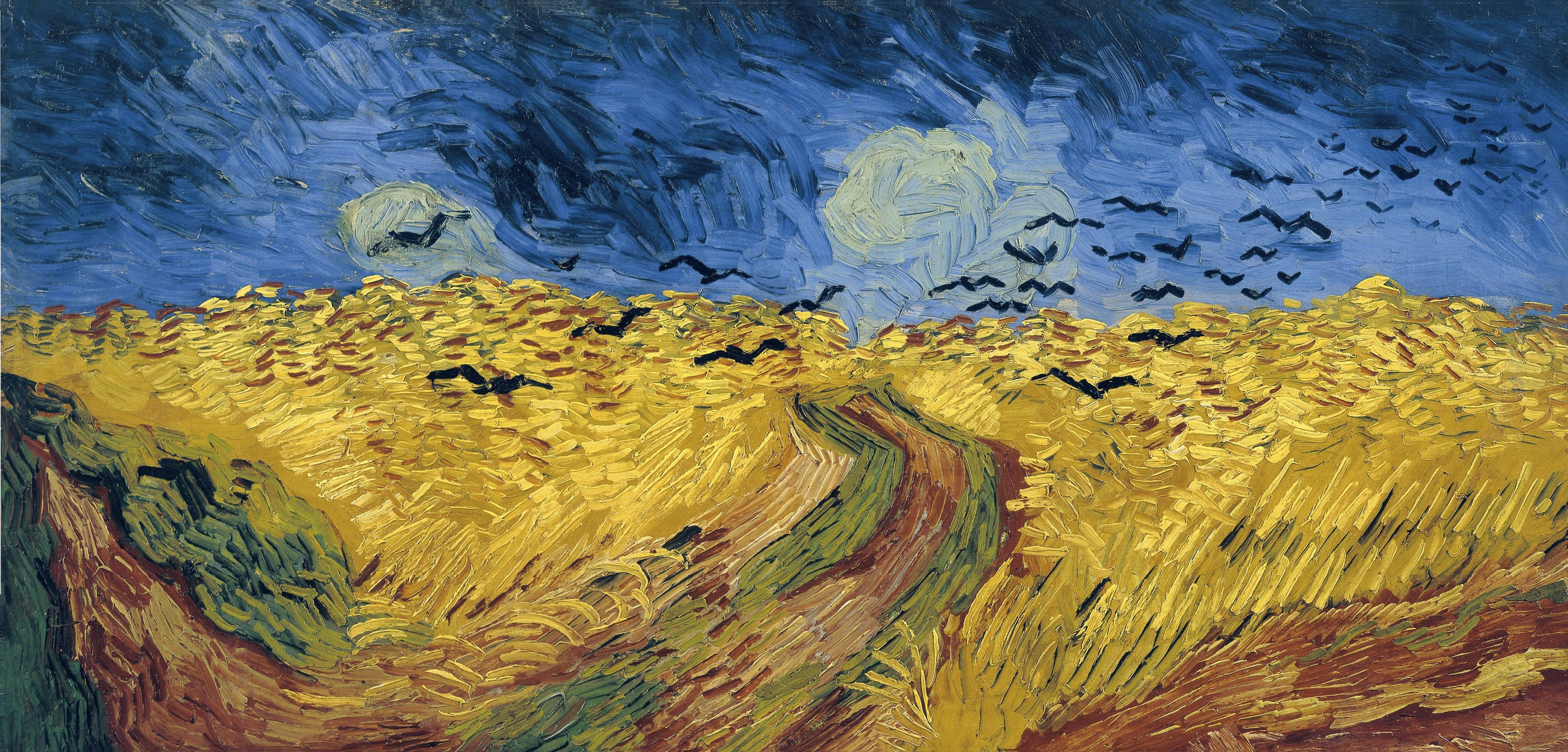
Wheat Field with Crows, 1890, Van Gogh Museum, Amsterdam, shares a double square canvas and motifs with Landscape at Auvers in the Rain

Van Gogh used wheatfields as an important motif in Landscape at Auvers in the Rain, as "in these immense stretches of wheatfields under turbulent skies, he tried to express sadness and extreme loneliness, but at the same time how healthy fortifying the countryside was", in a sense combining his isolation and loneliness with the newfound freedom he found upon moving to Auvers. Naomi Margolis Maurer emphasises the spiritual and psychological resonance of van Gogh's illustration of the storm, noting that "van Gogh's association of wheat with humanity [leads to] his vision of the endlessly rolling landscape as a manifestation of infinity and eternity ... for him, these vast fields of grain represented the vulnerable existence of mankind, and the storm epitomized those fateful, uncontrollable, but passing catastrophes which sweep through people's lives". Van Gogh's choice of subject matter reflects his own personal struggles with human catastrophe, as he battled mental illness and self-doubt amid his desire to create great art. The crows fluttering upward towards the foreground of the image are also an important motif of van Gogh's Auvers period, notably from the image Wheatfield with Crows, which shows them as an "object of approaching menace and anxiety whose swift advance signifies the fleeting passage of time and the inexorability of death". Therefore, the wheatfields and crows that surround the town have a deeper meaning, reflecting the cyclical nature of life, sadness, and death, important themes that van Gogh contemplated throughout his career as an artist.

=== Artistic style ===
Critics have noted that in this work van Gogh "celebrated the landscape in its own language, echoing the action of rain and wind, growth and decay, rather than observing the refined conventions of the Western painting tradition", revealing the artist's tendency to distort reality to create a more expressive representation of his personal feelings. Characteristically for his Auvers period, Landscape at Auvers in the Rain has a richly saturated palette of brilliant yellows and purples and a boldly abbreviated form, abstracting the important elements of the landscape. This simplification of form connects to the broader composition of the work, which emphasises the natural and emotional aura of the landscape over exact replication. However, his briefness is also indicative of the artist's "obsessive desire to produce" that came during his Auvers period, which is likely to have come from his newfound sense of freedom and autonomy after his institutionalisation. In a letter to his brother, van Gogh expressed how his move to Auvers impacted his stylistic choices, stating that "I already feel that it did me good to go south, the better to see the north. It is as I thought, I see more violet hues wherever they are." Purples are particularly apparent in the shadowed areas of Landscape at Auvers in the Rain, where they "add a moving resonance to the landscapes and enhance the brilliance of the greens, yellows, and blues", as well as in the sky. These colouristic choices and bold brushstrokes are characteristic of the Post-Impressionist style, as this movement rejected the "concern for the naturalistic depiction of light and color in favor of an emphasis on abstract qualities or symbolic content". Therefore, van Gogh's bold choices in colour and brushwork are indicative of his evolving technique as an increasingly innovative, original artist.

Stylistically, van Gogh also emulated the Japonisme movement, or the European imitation of traditional Japanese art, in Landscape at Auvers in the Rain. Japanese art was known to appear decorative and stylised. Through Landscape at Auvers in the Rain's striking bird's-eye perspective, patterned areas of colour, and rhythmic brushstrokes, van Gogh created this decorative effect. In his depiction of the wheatfields in the painting, van Gogh uses abstraction and linear patterns rather than a naturalistic treatment of the earth, evoking the Japanese prints that he and Theo collected. Furthermore, Japanese prints typically emphasise contour and lack of perspective, emphasising the patterned elements of an image, which corresponds to van Gogh's choice to create a rhythmic portrayal of rain droplets, piercing the image. Notably, van Gogh took direct inspiration for this patterned conception of a storm from a print by Utagawa Hiroshige titled Sudden Shower over Shin-Ōhashi Bridge and Atake. Hiroshige used vertical lines to create "a device which represents falling rain as multiple diagonal lines superimposed in the landscape". Using this highly stylised representation of a downpour, van Gogh integrated concepts of Japonisme with French landscape traditions. To critics, Landscape at Auvers in the Rain has a "startling effect, which links [van Gogh] to his own past, to his passion for Japan, and to his continuing engagement with the brute elements''.

=== Significance ===
Just three days separate Landscape at Auvers in the Rain from van Gogh's alleged suicide. Despite van Gogh's agony, depression, and hopelessness, his painting has sometimes been interpreted as containing signs of hope and renewal, closely connected to the invigoration of spirit van Gogh felt when spending time outdoors. Landscape at Auvers in the Rain expresses the relationship between nature and emotion that is van Gogh's signature form of expression, as he "imbued his landscapes with personal feelings ... in his landscape paintings he wanted to express the emotions that nature evoked in him". The artist distorted reality to enhance the expression of his emotions in the work. The image's lack of distinct subject matter and identifying signs of Auvers relate to van Gogh's goal of creating a relationship between nature and emotion. One critic notes that van Gogh's true innovation with Landscape at Auvers in the Rain is his ability to create an expansive image that transforms a landscape into a metaphor, noting that even singular forms in the painting, such as the crows, "lift from the fields and are lost in the vegetation beyond the motifs and subject matter, and as in other paintings of the same format, the painting itself becomes the subject matter ... the motif is literally drowned in painting". Through these stylistic choices, van Gogh urges the viewer to share in the intensity of his emotion and enter his own distorted expression of reality. Van Gogh's efforts to create a new type of landscape are reflected in his own words; in a letter to Theo at the end of his life he stated that he could "see from afar the possibility of a new painting", noting that "before such nature I feel powerless".

The rainy storm is central to the emotional expression that Landscape at Auvers in the Rain aims to convey. The layered, horizontal bands reflecting the countryside are interrupted by the rain, which lashes down in great streaks across the canvas, creating a dramatic emotional impact. While these features are abstracted and stylised rather than naturalistic, they still maintain the sense of emotion the artist wished to convey, notably the cycle of human pain and suffering. Van Gogh himself associated the inevitable natural phenomena of rainstorms with the parallel inevitability of anguish throughout the human lifespan. However, the painting is not simply an expression of hopelessness and despair. Van Gogh wrote to Theo that nature was a refuge from his troubles, and specifically, "when suffering is sometimes so great it fills the whole horizon that it takes on the proportions of a hopeless deluge ... it is better to look at a wheat field, even in the form of a picture." To certain critics, his use of the bright yellows to signify the wheat-filled countryside was a symbol of comfort for van Gogh in his distress because "it embodied the ongoing process of life, the irrelevance of the individual's fate in the overall beauty and harmony of the divine order".

== Reception ==
While he did not find success during his lifetime, van Gogh's work became increasingly coveted after his death. Encouraged by the art dealer Hugh Blaker, Gwendoline Davies purchased Landscape at Auvers in the Rain in 1920 from the Bernheim-Jeune Gallery in Paris for £2,020 (equivalent to £78,176 in 2025). Davies and her sister Margaret inherited a fortune from their grandfather, David Davies, which they dedicated to amassing one of the largest collections of Impressionist and Post-Impressionist art in Britain during the early twentieth century. Davies brought the painting to Wales, where it was displayed in the music room of her home, Gregynog Hall. Notably, the painting was almost purchased by the Japanese art collector Koyata Yamamoto a short time earlier, connecting to the work's Japonisme elements. The painting was donated to the National Museum of Wales in Cardiff as part of Davies's bequest in 1952.

== See also ==
- List of works by Vincent van Gogh
