= Bracquemond =

Bracquemond is a surname. Notable people with the surname include:

- Félix Bracquemond (1833–1914), French painter and etcher, husband of Marie
- Marie Bracquemond (1840–1916), French Impressionist painter
