= At the Moulin Rouge, The Dance =

Painting by Henri de Toulouse-Lautrec

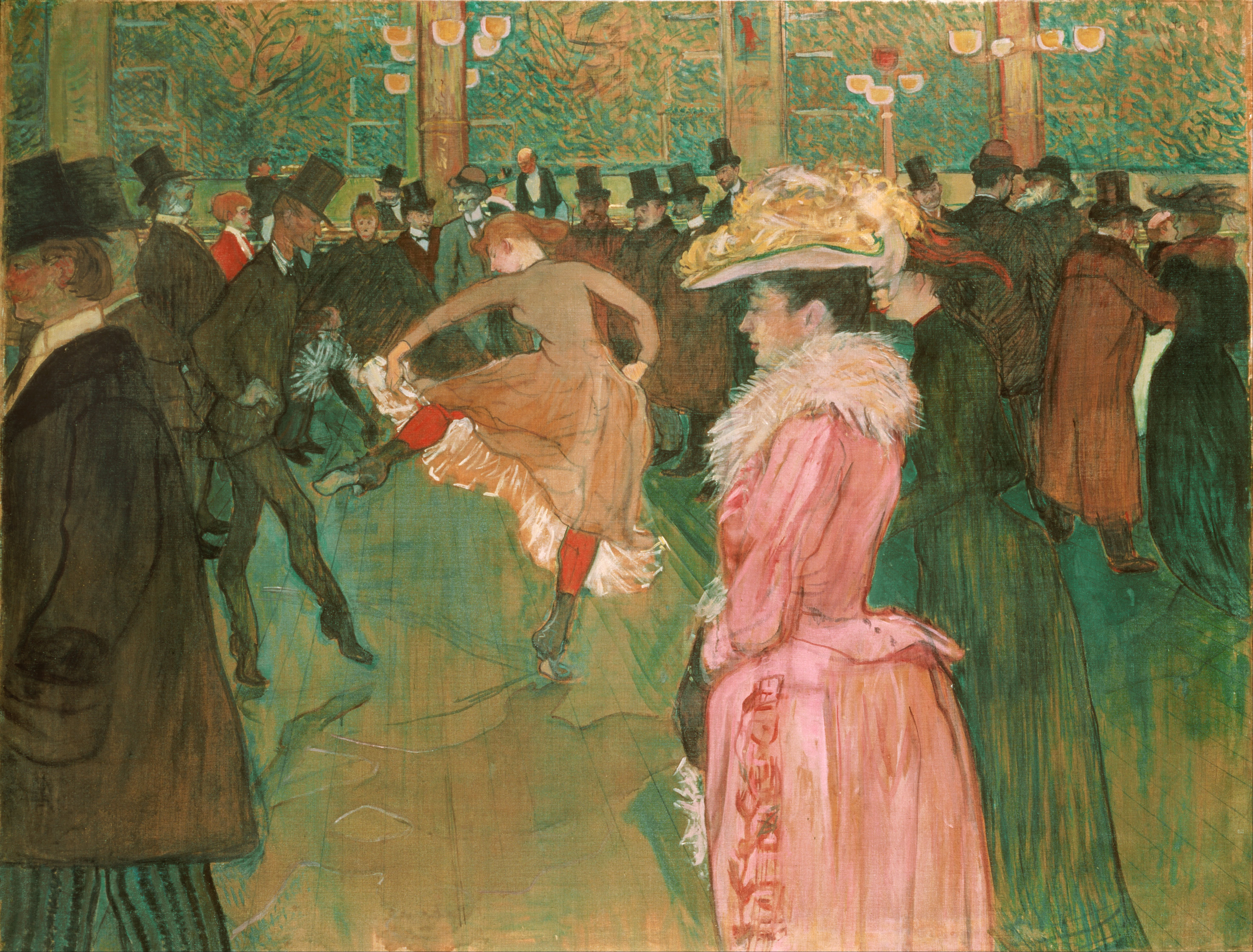
- Artist: Henri de Toulouse-Lautrec
- Year: 1890
- Medium: Oil on canvas
- Movement: Post Impressionism
- Dimensions: 115.6 cm × 149.9 cm (45.51 in × 59.02 in)
- Location: Philadelphia Museum of Art

At the Moulin Rouge, the Dance is an oil-on-canvas painted by French artist Henri de Toulouse-Lautrec. It was painted in 1890, and is the second of a number of graphic paintings by Toulouse-Lautrec depicting the Moulin Rouge cabaret built in Paris in 1889. It portrays two dancers dancing the can-can in the middle of the crowded dance hall. A recently discovered inscription by Toulouse-Lautrec on the back of the painting reads: "The instruction of the new ones by Valentine the Boneless." This means that the man to the left of the woman dancing is Valentin le désossé, a well-known dancer at the Moulin Rouge, and he is teaching the newest addition to the cabaret. To the right is a mysterious aristocratic woman in pink. The background also features many aristocratic people such as poet Edward Yeats, the club owner and even Toulouse-Lautrec's father. The work is currently displayed at the Philadelphia Museum of Art.
