= Boating on the River Epte =

1890 painting by Claude Monet

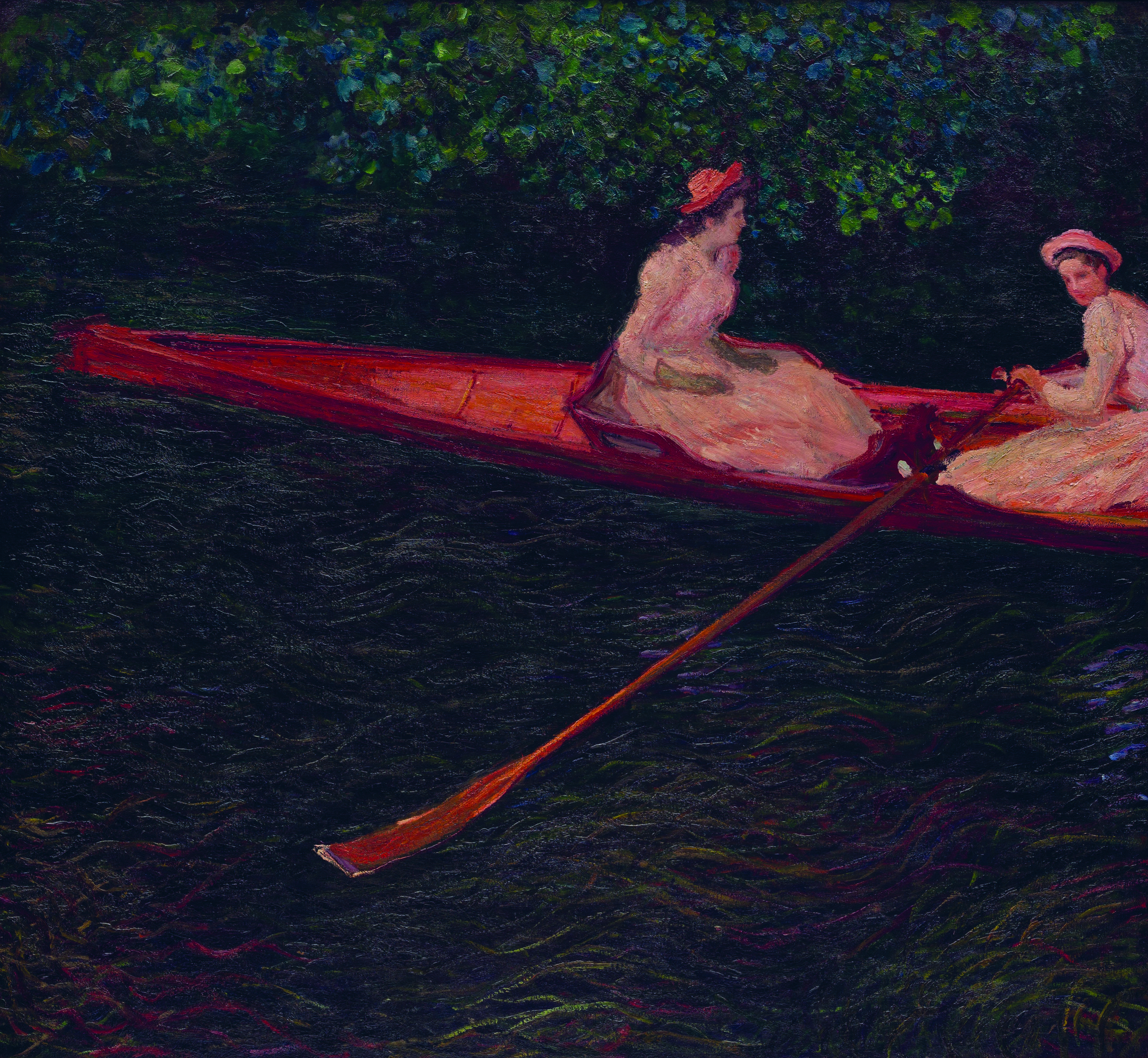
- Artist: Claude Monet
- Year: 1890
- Medium: oil on canvas
- Dimensions: 133 cm × 145 cm (52 in × 57 in)
- Location: São Paulo Museum of Art, São Paulo

Boating on the River Epte (also known as The Canoe on the Epte) is an 1890 oil painting by French impressionist artist Claude Monet. It is currently housed at the São Paulo Museum of Art.

Between 1887 and 1890 Monet concerned himself with portraying scenes from the River Epte, which skirted his property at Giverny. The sisters Suzanne and Blanche Hoschedé posed for this series of pictures, their late father being banker Ernest Hoschedé, a patron of the arts and collector of Monet, and their mother, Alice, who became Monet's second wife. This series began with La Barque Rose (private collection) and also included La Barque à Giverny (Musée d'Orsay, Paris) and En Barque (National Museum of Western Art, Tokyo).

Boating on the River Epte, which also has a preparatory study, was mentioned by Monet in a letter to critic and friend Geffroy, dated June 22, 1890: “I am again vexed by things that are impossible to do: water with undulating vegetation on the bottom”. Monet's friendship with photographer Nadar and his genuine interest in photography influenced the framing of the composition as well as the out-of-focus effect produced by the movement of the boat on the water to be seen in the Hoschedé sisters. In addition, a possible influence on the work's composition is suggested to be an engraving by Suzuki Harunobu entitled Woman Collecting Lotus Flowers.

== See also ==
- List of paintings by Claude Monet
