= The Town Hall at Auvers =

1890 painting by van Gogh

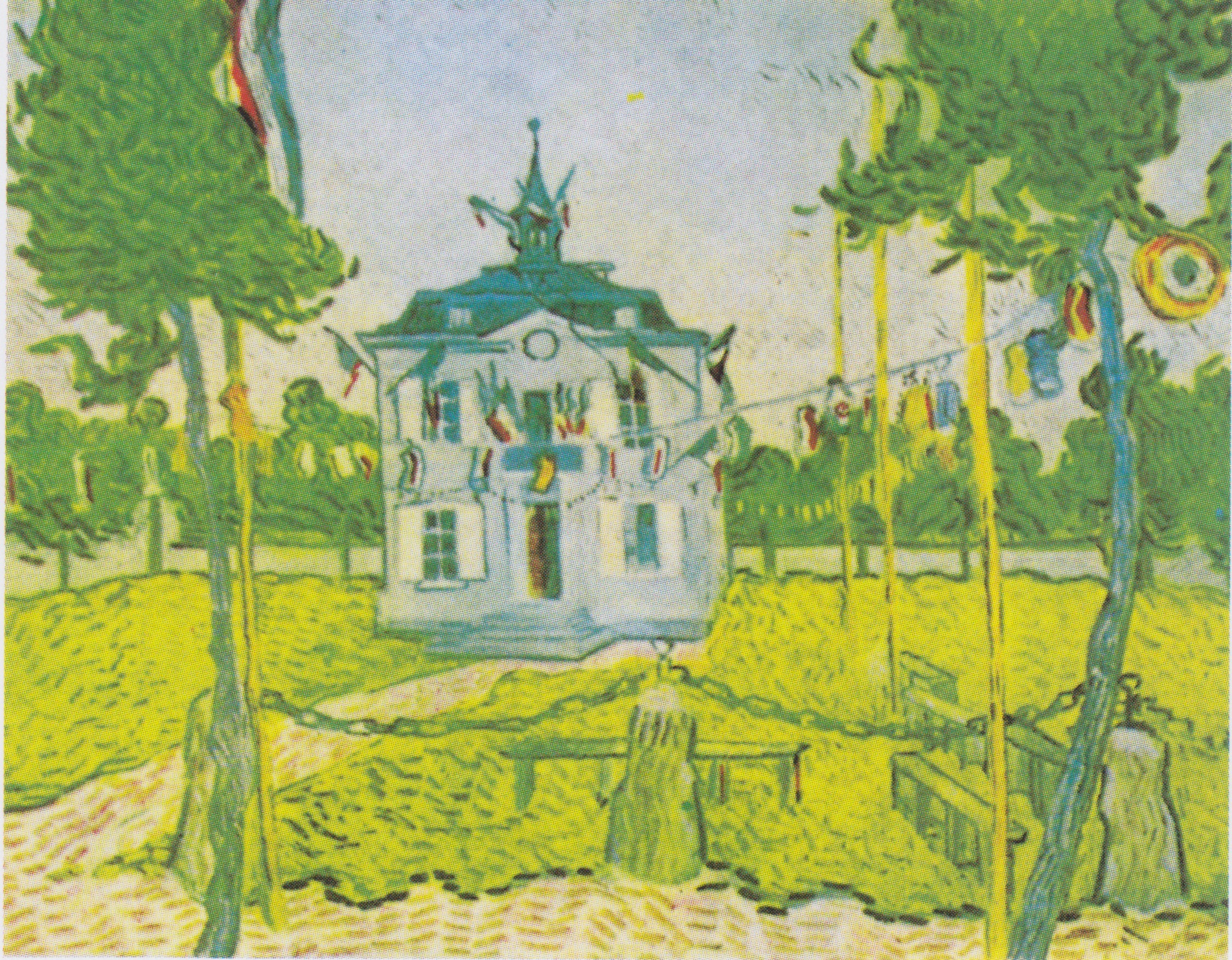
- Artist: Vincent van Gogh
- Year: 1890
- Catalogue: F790
- Medium: Oil on canvas
- Dimensions: 53 cm × 103 cm (21 in × 41 in)
- Location: Private collection

The Town Hall at Auvers is a painting by Vincent van Gogh, executed mid-July 1890. It is based on the view Van Gogh had when he stepped out on the street from the Auberge Ravoux, where he stayed.

Along with other canvases from his short period in Auvers-sur-Oise, such as The Church at Auvers and paintings of houses with thatched roofs, this painting seems reminiscent of scenes from the northern landscapes of Van Gogh's childhood and youth.

== See also ==
- List of works by Vincent van Gogh
