= Tree Roots =

Painting by Vincent van Gogh

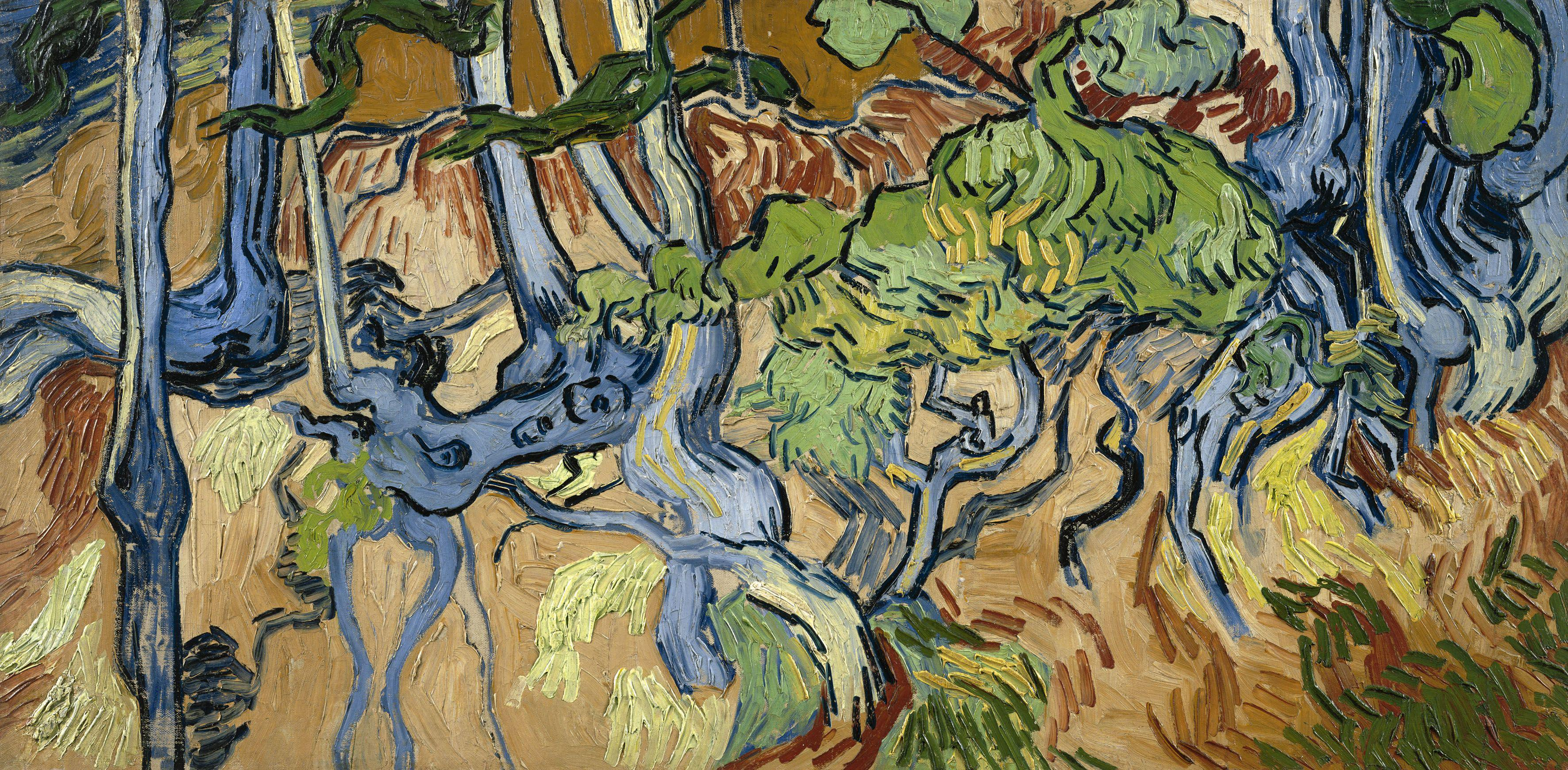
- Artist: Vincent van Gogh
- Year: 1890
- Catalogue: F816; JH2113
- Medium: Oil on canvas
- Movement: Post Impressionism
- Dimensions: 50.0 cm × 100.0 cm (19.7 in × 40.6 in)
- Location: Van Gogh Museum, Amsterdam

Tree Roots is an oil painting by Vincent van Gogh that he painted in July 1890 when he lived in Auvers-sur-Oise, France. Likely Van Gogh's final painting, it is an example of the double-square canvases that he employed in his last landscapes.

== Background ==
Van Gogh spent the last few months of his life in Auvers-sur-Oise, a small town just north of Paris, after he left an asylum at Saint-Rémy in May 1890. The painting is considered by some to be his last painting before his death in late July 1890.

Jan Hulsker considers it the most original of his double-square canvases. The viewer thinks he can identify tree roots and trunks, but is hard put to identify the subject as a whole. Van der Veen and Knapp comment that in this painting, as also in Undergrowth with Two Figures, the painting itself and not the subject is pre-eminent, heralding abstract painting and German expressionism.

In 1882, while at The Hague, Van Gogh had made a study of tree roots, Study of a Tree (below), which he had completed at the same time as a larger version (now lost) of Sorrow. In a letter to his brother Theo, Van Gogh said that he wanted to express something of life's struggle in these drawings. It is not known whether he had returned to the same thoughts with his 1890 Tree Roots. The letters give no hint and the colours are perhaps too bright for such sombre thoughts.

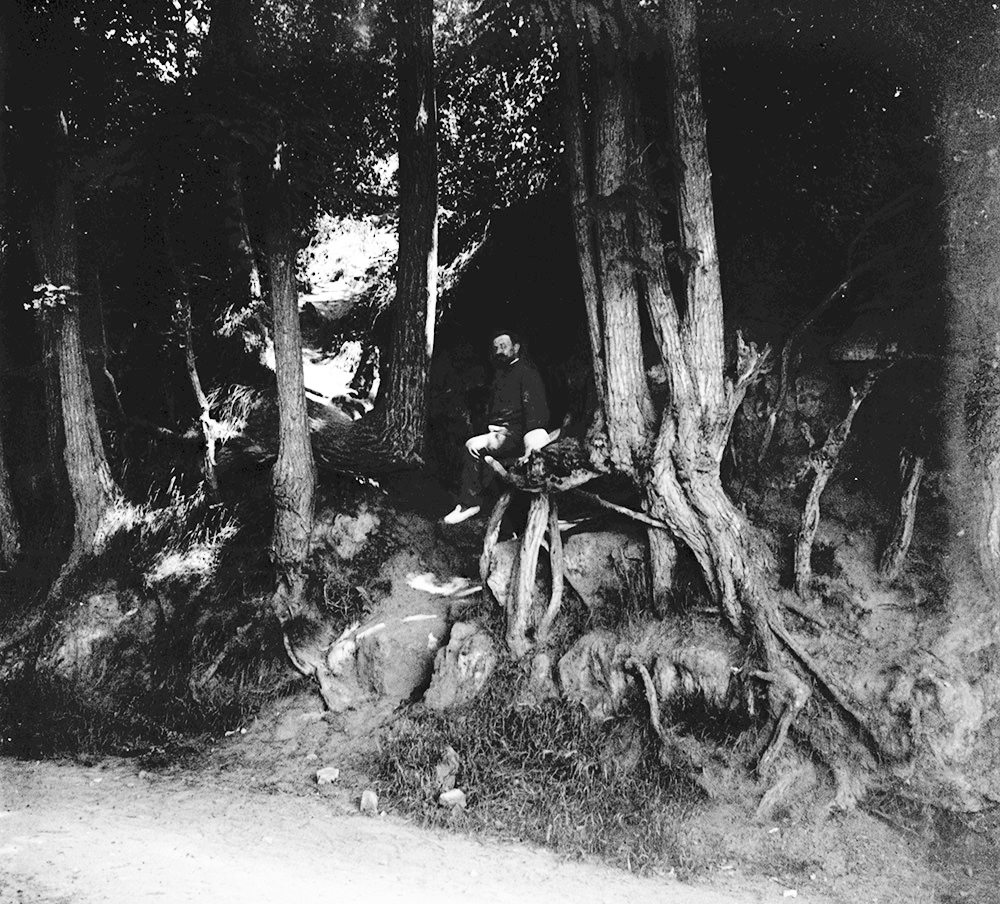
The location of the subject for Tree Roots around 1906

On April 14, 1991 Tree Roots was stolen from the Van Gogh museum along with 19 other paintings. Tree Roots was successfully recovered.

In 2020, Wouter Van der Veen, scientific director of Institut Van Gogh determined the probable location where the painting was made, based on an historical postcard, to be on the rue Daubigny in Auvers-sur-Oise. He confirmed his finding with a historical photograph from circa 1907 in 2021. The location is about 150 metres from Auberge Ravoux, Van Gogh's hotel at the time.

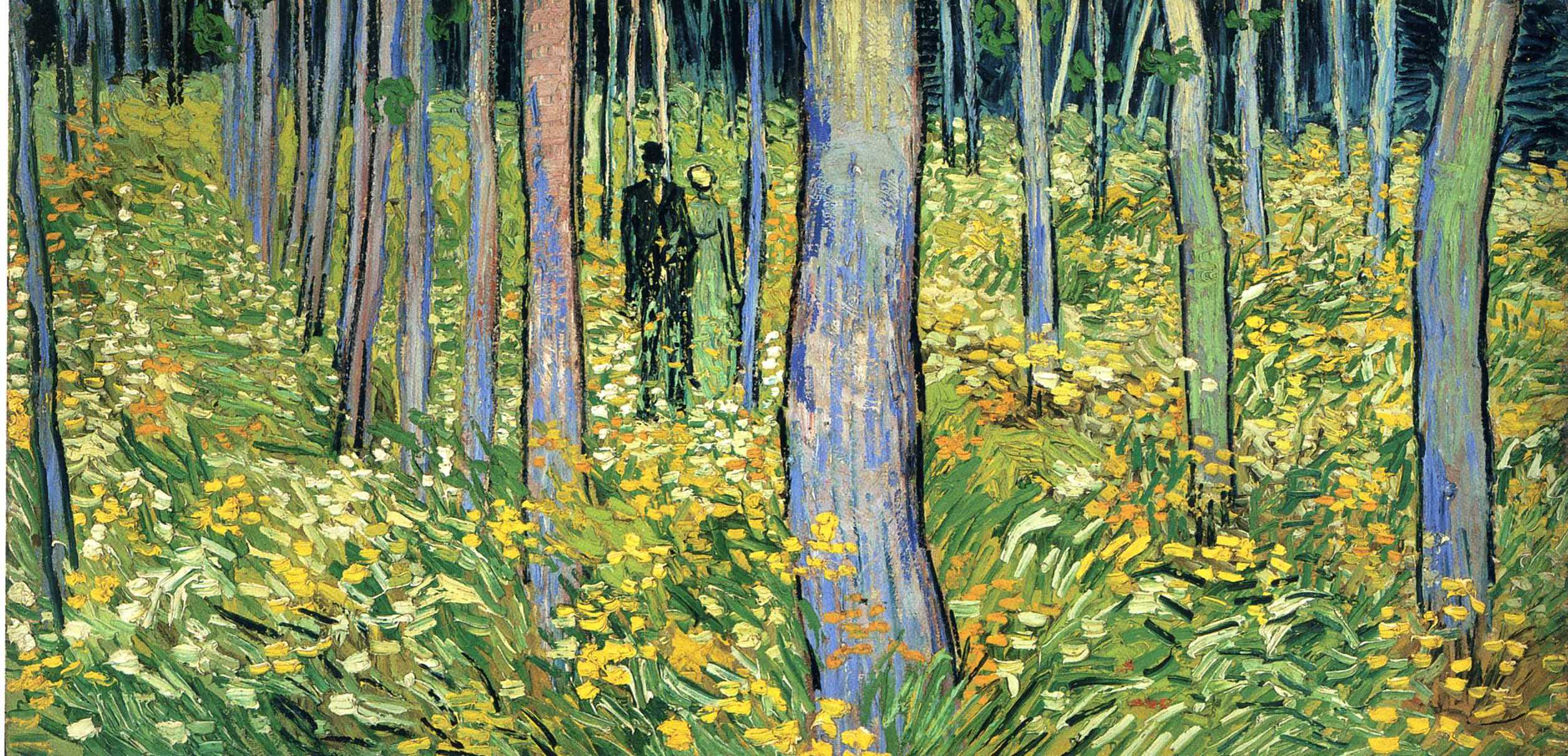
Undergrowth with Two Figures, oil on canvas 50 x 100, late June 1890 (F773, JH2041).

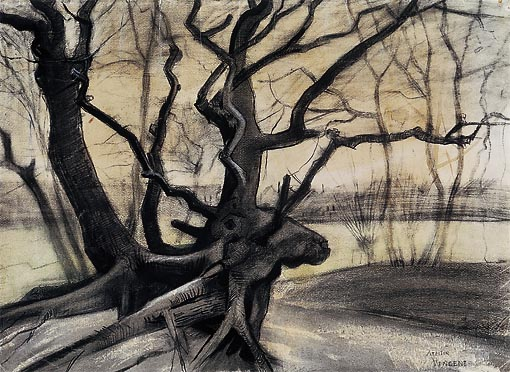
Tree roots in a sandy ground ('Les racines'), pencil, black chalk, brush in ink, brown and grey wash, opaque watercolour on watercolour paper, April–May 1882, Kröller-Müller Museum, Otterlo (F933, JH142). (Note: "Tree roots in a sandy ground ('Les racines')". Kröller-Müller Museum, Otterlo.)

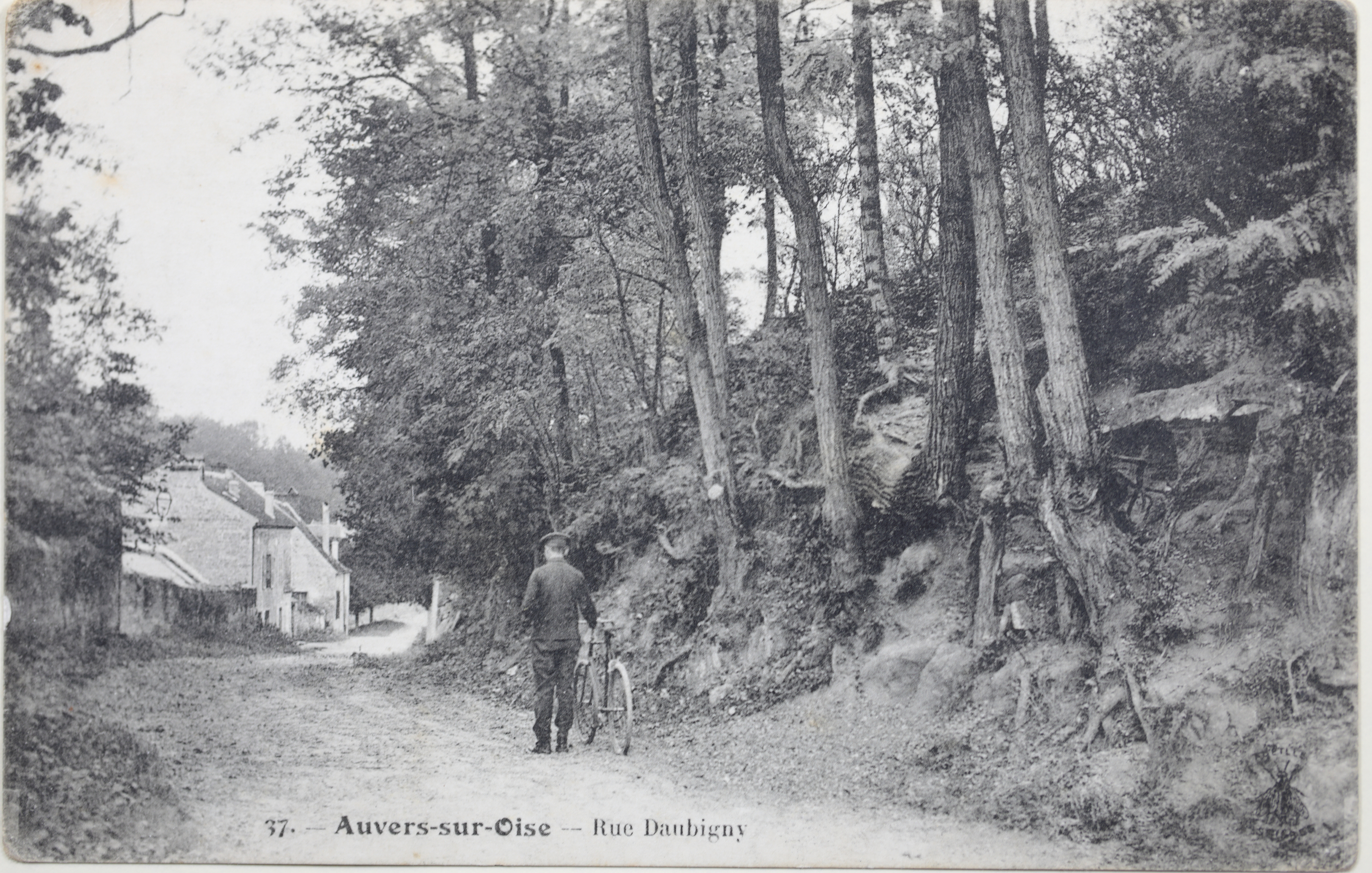
Post Card rue Daubigny, around 1910

== Hidden Self-Portrait Hypothesis ==
In 2023, photographer Raymond Martinez suggested that the upper portion of "Tree Roots" might contain a hidden self-portrait of Vincent van Gogh. According to this interpretation, Van Gogh could have depicted his profile, one eye closed, as if rising toward the sky. Martinez noted similarities between this image and the posthumous sketch by Dr. Paul Gachet, made shortly after the artist's death.

This hypothesis has not been scientifically validated by Van Gogh scholars. It raises questions about the possibility that the artist intentionally included a posthumous self-portrait, potentially linked to his spiritual beliefs.

== See also ==
- List of works by Vincent van Gogh

== Bibliography ==
- de la Faille, Jacob-Baart. The Works of Vincent van Gogh: His Paintings and Drawings. Amsterdam: Meulenhoff, 1970. ISBN 978-1-55660-811-7
- Hulsker, Jan. The Complete Van Gogh. Oxford: Phaidon, 1980. ISBN 978-0-71482-028-6
- Naifeh, Steven; Smith, Gregory White. Van Gogh: The Life. Profile Books, 2011. ISBN 978-1-84668-010-6
- van der Veen, Wouter; Knapp, Peter. Van Gogh in Auvers: His Last Days. Monacelli Press, 2010. ISBN 978-1-58093-301-8
- Martinez, Raymond (2024). Sur les traces de Vincent Van Gogh (in French). Fontvieille: Éditions de l'Arlésienne. ISBN 979-10-415-3749-5.
