= Daubigny's Garden =

1890 paintings by van Gogh

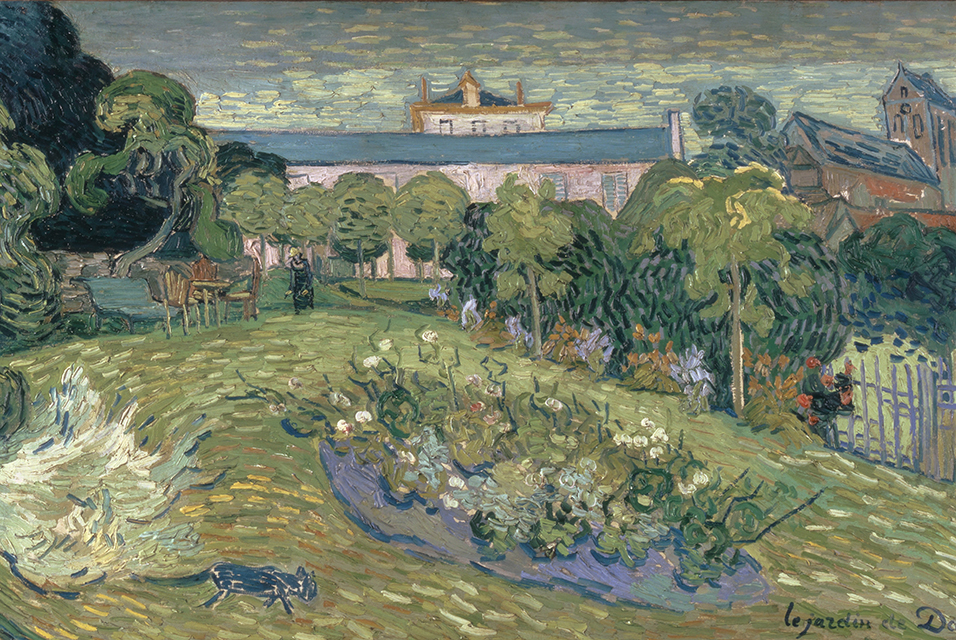
- Artist: Vincent van Gogh
- Year: 1890
- Catalogue: F777; JH2105
- Medium: Oil on canvas
- Dimensions: 56 cm × 101 cm (22 in × 39.8 in)
- Location: Kunstmuseum Basel, Basel

Daubigny's Garden
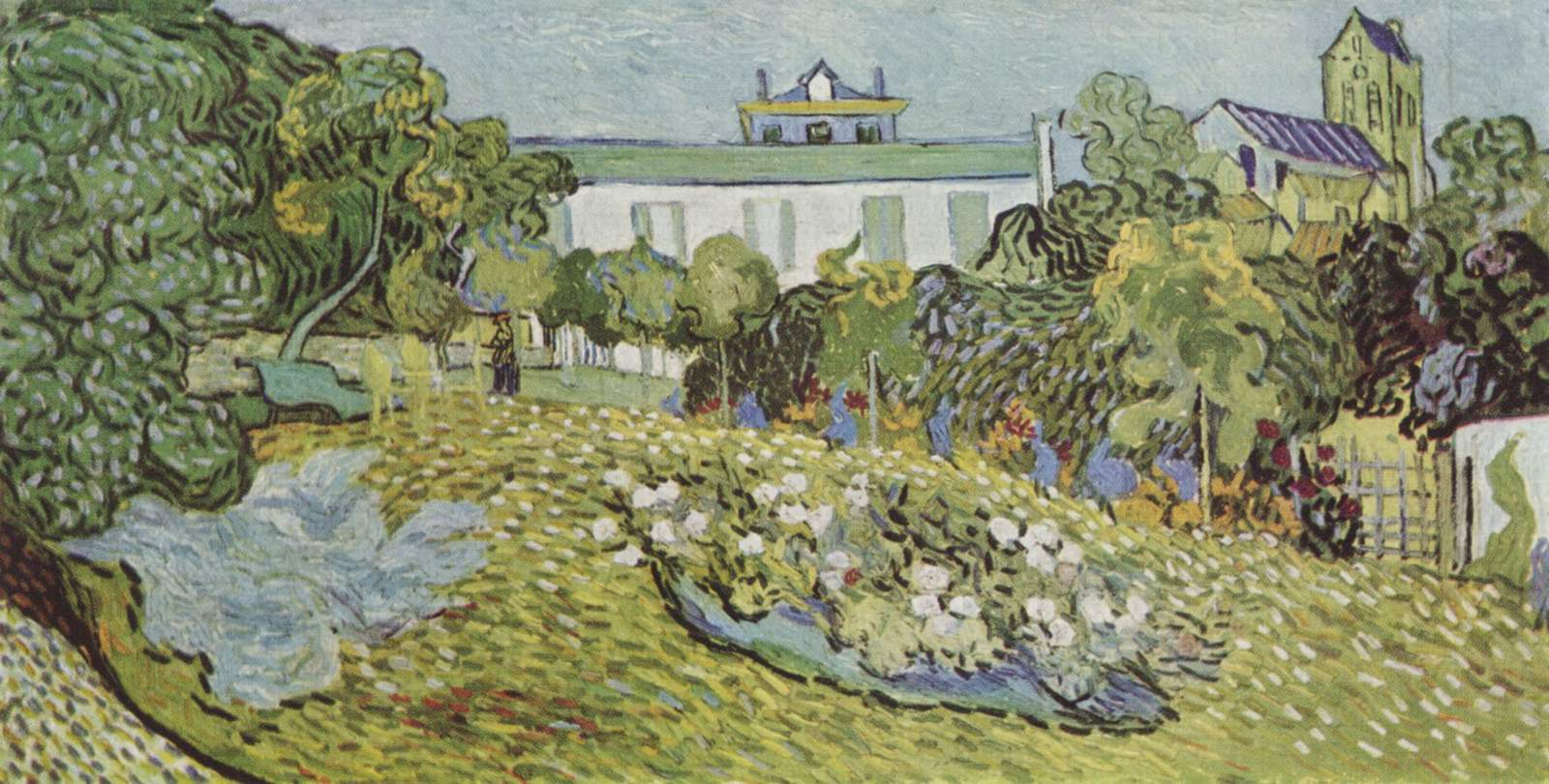
- Artist: Vincent van Gogh
- Year: 1890
- Catalogue: F776; JH2104
- Medium: Oil on canvas
- Dimensions: 56 cm × 101 cm (22 in × 39.8 in)
- Location: Hiroshima Museum of Art, Hiroshima

Daubigny's Garden, painted three times by Vincent van Gogh, depicts the enclosed garden of Charles-François Daubigny, a painter whom van Gogh admired throughout his life.

Van Gogh started with a small study of a section of the garden. Then he worked on two double-square paintings of the full walled garden. The paintings were made in Auvers between May and July 1890, during the last few months of his life. All three paintings are titled Daubigny's Garden and are distinguished by the museums they reside in: Kunstmuseum Basel, Hiroshima Museum of Art and Van Gogh Museum.

== Charles-François Daubigny ==
Van Gogh greatly admired Charles-François Daubigny, a French landscape artist associated with the Barbizon school who painted river and coastal scenes en plein air. Daubigny was born in Paris in 1817 and moved to Auvers-sur-Oise in 1860. In 1878 van Gogh wrote to his brother Theo that he was very sad to hear the news that Daubigny had died because his work touched him very deeply, "A work that is good may not last forever, but the thought expressed by it will, and the work itself will surely survive for a very long time, and those who come later can do no more than follow in the footsteps of such predecessors and copy their example."

When van Gogh came to Auvers in 1890 Daubigny's widow still occupied their house. He painted Daubigny's garden three times: twice with the entire enclosed garden on double-square canvas and an earlier study of a portion of the garden.

== Auvers-sur-Oise ==
The pastoral Auvers-sur-Oise region of hills, fields, gardens and cottages attracted artists to it and the surrounding area. Starting in 1850 a railroad line facilitated travel from Auvers from Paris. Artists who came to the area to paint included the Impressionists Armand Guillaumin, Camille Pissarro and Paul Cézanne.

In May 1890 van Gogh left Saint-Rémy for Auvers where it provided a quieter life than that of Paris, but was still near his brother Theo for visits. In Auvers he was under the care of Paul Gachet, a homeopathic physician, who advised van Gogh to not worry about his illness and focus on his painting. Gachet, an amateur painter, became a good friend. To Theo he described Gachet as "something like another brother."

In van Gogh's first letter to his brother from Auvers he wrote, "It is profoundly beautiful, it is the real country, characteristic and picturesque."

== Paintings ==
=== The entire garden, Kunstmuseum Basel ===
Van Gogh wrote in a letter dated 23 July 1890 to his brother Theo, "Perhaps you'll take a look at this sketch of Daubigny's garden – it is one of my most carefully thought-out canvases." In both double-squares, the garden is furnished as a welcoming outdoor living space with a bench, table and chairs. In this painting a woman, cat and blooming flowers bring life to the setting; in the second version of the painting the cat is painted over. The landscaped garden, the focal point, contains a rose bed in the foreground and is surrounded by trees. In the background is a large house and a church with a Romanesque steeple. The beautifully manicured and landscaped Daubigny's Garden elevated the posthumous reputation of Charles-François Daubigny as a successful, cultured man of Auvers.

The painting was made on "double-square" canvas. The initial study, on extended loan to the Kunstmuseum Basel from the Rudolf Staechelin Family Foundation, has a black cat in the foreground towards the left.

=== The entire garden, Hiroshima Museum of Art ===
The painting in which van Gogh described the sky as "pale green" is very similar to the first [Kunstmuseum Basel] double-square but lacks the black cat but was later painted over. This slightly later version, also on double-square canvas, is on extended loan to the Hiroshima Museum of Art.

=== Portion of the Garden, Van Gogh Museum ===
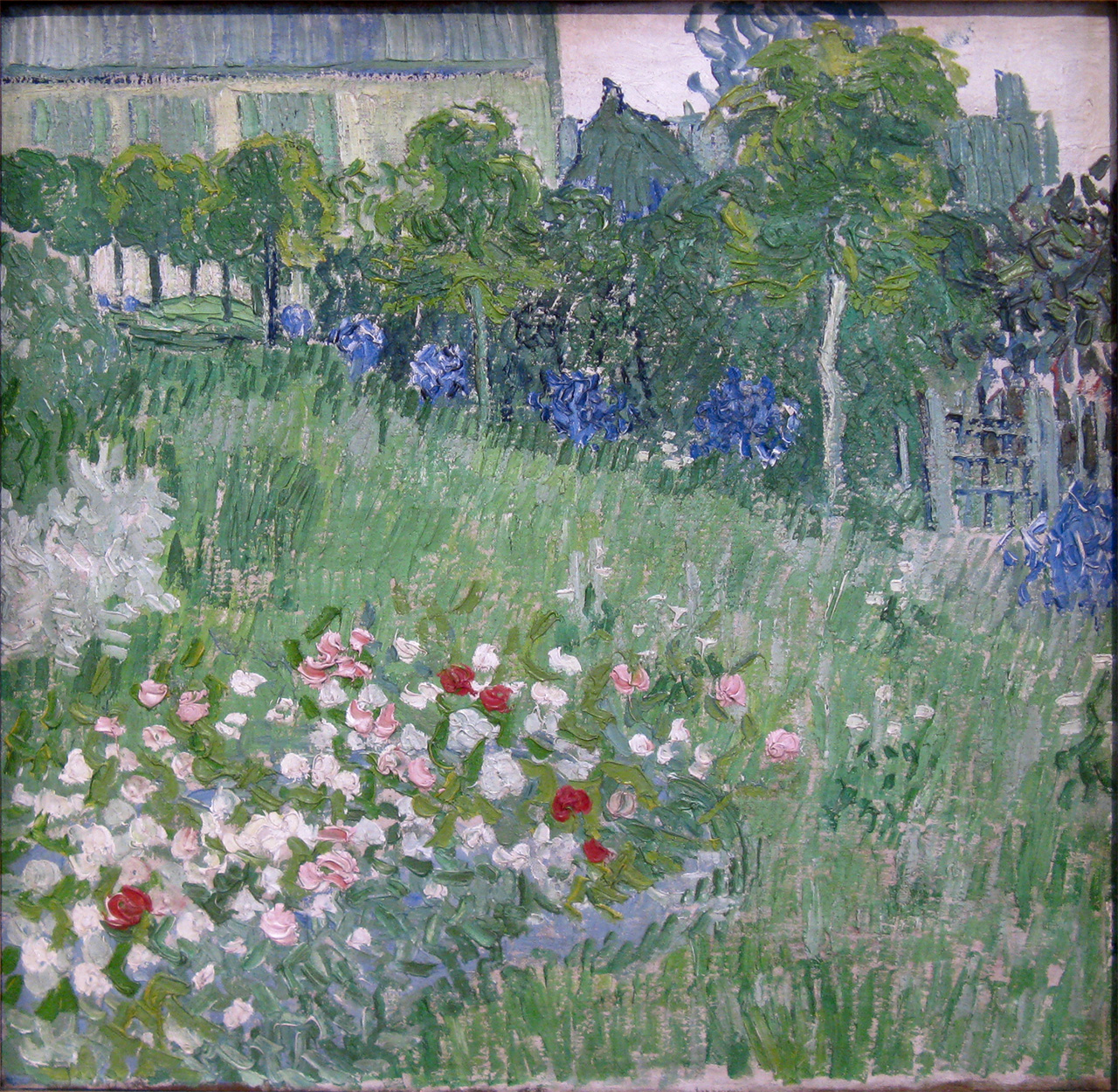
Daubigny's Garden (F765, JH2029), 1890, Van Gogh Museum, Amsterdam

The Van Gogh Museum study was made first of a portion of the enclosed garden. He made a little sketch of it for Theo, with a description: "In the foreground green and pink grass… In the center a rose bush, to the right a little gate… [and] a row of yellow lindens. The house itself is in the background, pink with a roof of bluish tiles."

== Controversy surrounding the Daubigny's Garden (F776) ==
Prior to World War I questions arose regarding whether one of the double-square canvases was a forgery. After the war legitimate van Gogh paintings were mixed up with forgeries in the inventory of German art dealer Otto Wacker. Wacker was put on trial after successfully selling a forgery of van Gogh's self-portrait. Upon testimony of the best van Gogh experts Wacker was sentenced for his crime, but mystery surrounding the forgery remained.

In 1929 Ludwig Justi, the director of the Berlin National Gallery, was particularly interested in the version of Daubigny's Garden (F776) owned by Paris art dealer Paul Rosenberg. French painter and collector Emile Schuffenecker, who was known to have made copies of van Gogh's work, had at one point possessed this Daubigny's Garden. Knowing that there were rumors surrounding the authenticity of the painting, Justi discreetly inquired about its provenance, and received "a detailed and reassuring answer." In 1929, about 70 individuals established the Verein der Freunde der Nationalgalerie (Society of Friends of the National Gallery) to purchase art to lend to the National Gallery on a long-term basis. Daubigny's Garden was one of their first purchases, for 240,000 reichsmarks.

== See also ==
- List of works by Vincent van Gogh
