= The Seine at Rouen =

Painting by Claude Monet

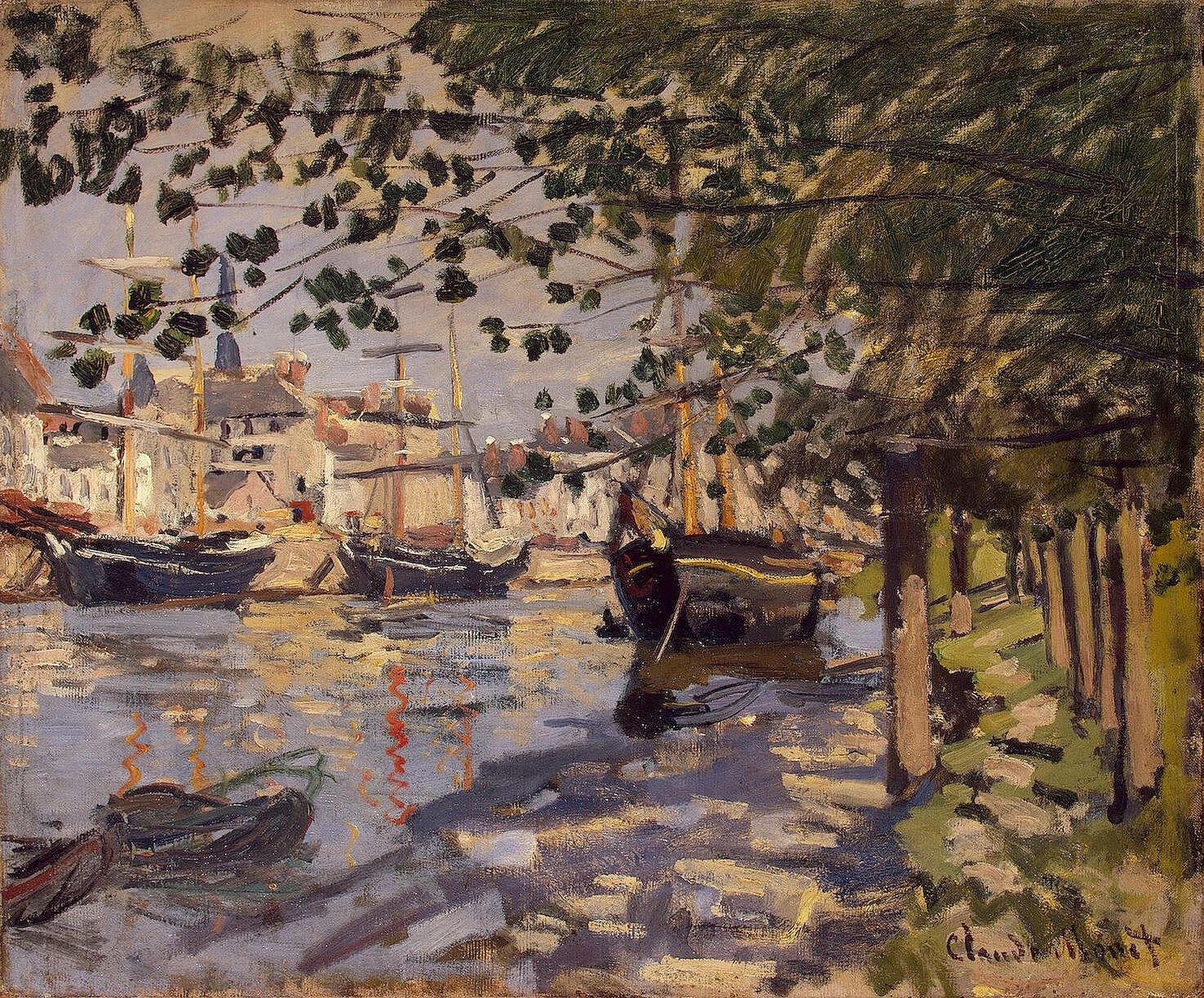
- Artist: Claude Monet
- Year: 1872
- Medium: Oil canvas painting
- Location: Hermitage Museum

The Seine at Rouen is an 1872 oil on canvas painting by Claude Monet, now part of the Otto Krebs collection at the Hermitage Museum in Saint Petersburg. It shows a sunny scene of sailing boats moored by the quays on the Seine in Rouen.

== Other Monets in the Hermitage ==
- Woman in the Garden (1867)
- The Seine at Asnières (1873)
- The Grand Quai at Le Havre (1874)
- Woman in a Garden (1876)
- Garden (1876)
- Corner of a Garden in Montgeron (1876)
- Pond at Montgeron (1877)
- Garden at Bordighera, Morning (1884)
- Poppy Field (1886)
- Mill at Giverny (1886)
- Near Giverny, Sunrise (1888)
- Cliffs Near Dieppe (1897)
- Waterloo Bridge (1903)

A retrospective of works by Monet (including The Seine at Rouen) was held at the Hermitage from February to May 2002, with most of his surviving works from all around the world.

== See also ==
- List of paintings by Claude Monet

== Bibliography ==
- (in Russian) Albert Kostenevitch, Catalogue de l'exposition de la peinture française des XIXe et XXe siècles [à l'Ermitage] issue des collections privées d'Allemagne, Culture Ministry of the Russian Federation, Hermitage Museum, Saint Petersburg, 1995, German translation published by Kindler, Munich, 1995
