= Garden at Bordighera, Morning =

1884 painting by Claude Monet

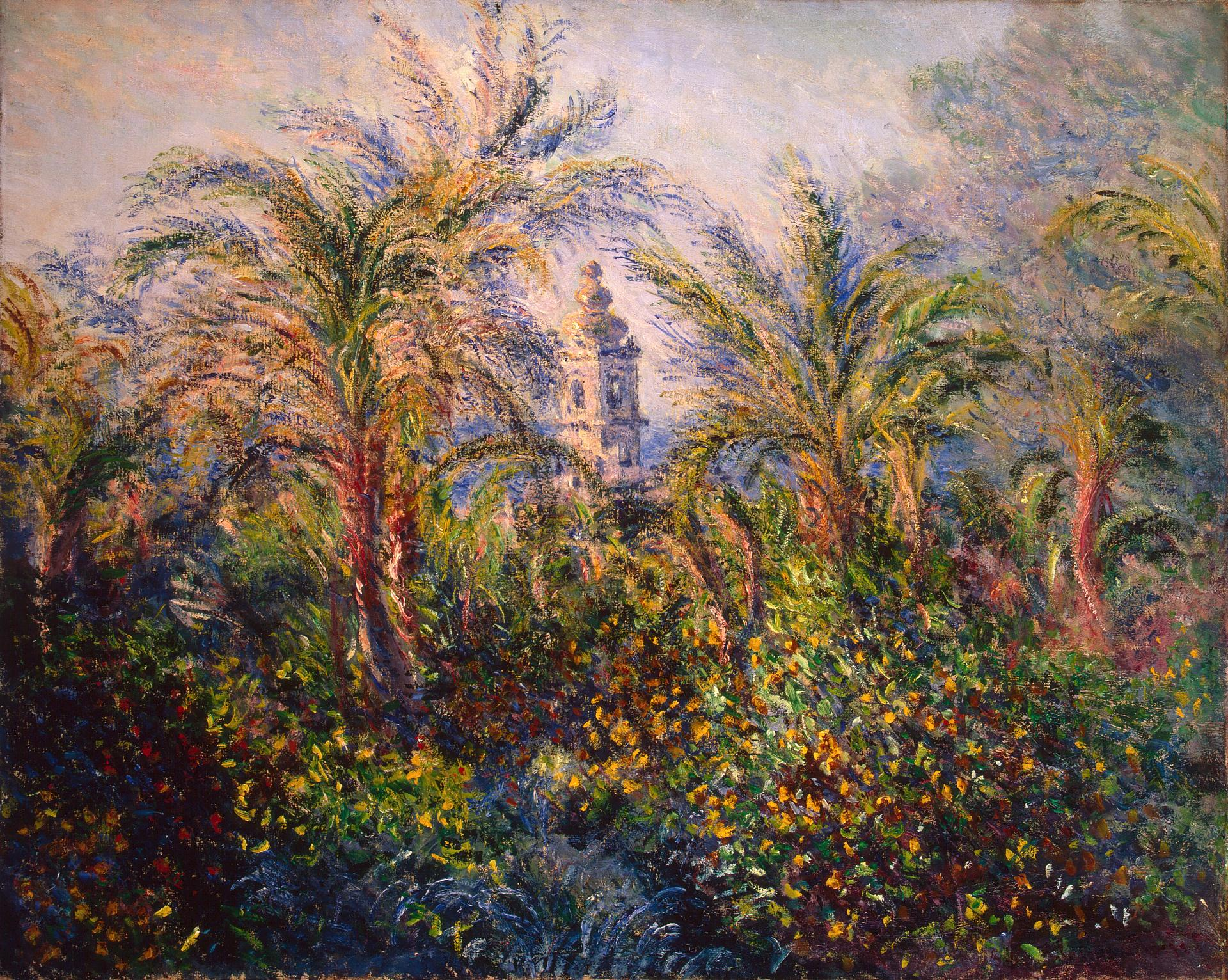

Garden at Bordighera, Morning is an 1884 oil on canvas painting by Claude Monet, now in the Otto Krebs collection at the Hermitage Museum, first displayed to the public in 1995.

Showing palm trees and a church tower in the background, the work was produced during a stay in Bordighera on the Ligurian coast of Italy from January to April 1884. He wrote to his art critic friend Théodore Duret "I set up in a fairyland. It would take a palette of diamonds and precious stones".

== Other Monets in the Hermitage ==
- Woman in the Garden (1867)
- The Seine at Rouen (1872)
- The Seine at Asnières (1873)
- The Grand Quai at Le Havre (1874)
- Woman in a Garden (1876)
- Garden (1876)
- Corner of a Garden in Montgeron (1876)
- Pond at Montgeron (1877)
- Poppy Field (1886)
- Mill at Giverny (1886)
- Near Giverny, Sunrise (1888)
- Cliffs Near Dieppe (1897)
- Waterloo Bridge (1903)

== See also ==
- List of paintings by Claude Monet
