= Place de la Concorde (Degas) =

Painting by Edgar Degas

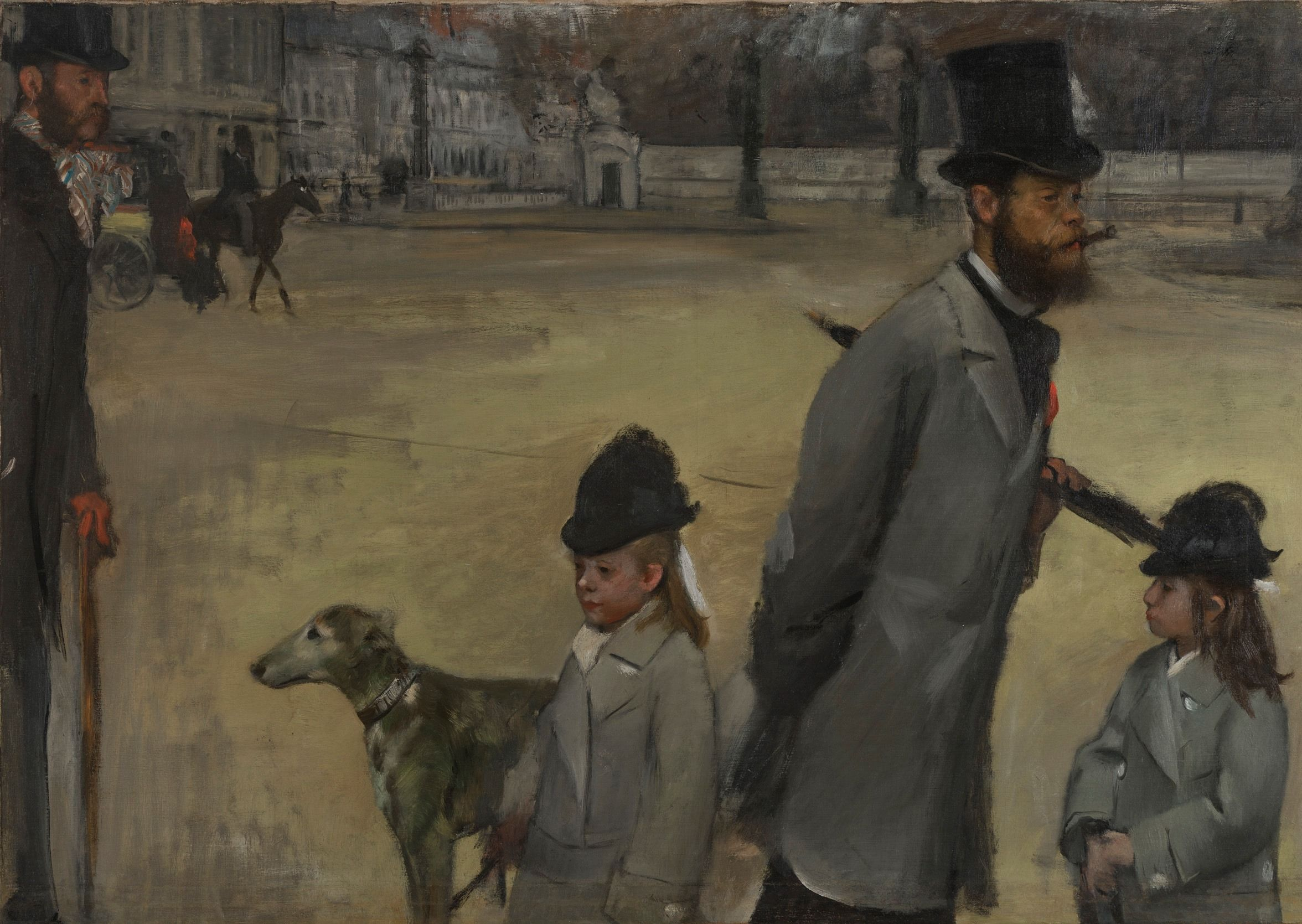
- Artist: Edgar Degas
- Year: 1875
- Medium: Oil on canvas
- Movement: Impressionism
- Dimensions: 78.4 cm × 117.5 cm (30.9 in × 46.3 in)
- Location: Hermitage Museum, Saint Petersburg

Place de la Concorde or Viscount Lepic and his Daughters Crossing the Place de la Concorde is an 1875 oil painting by Edgar Degas. It depicts the cigar-smoking Ludovic-Napoléon Lepic, his daughters Eylau and Jeanine, his dog, and a solitary man on the left at Place de la Concorde in Paris. The man on the left may be the playwright Ludovic Halévy. The Tuileries Gardens can be seen in the background, behind a stone wall.

Notable for its innovative composition, use of negative space, and cropping, the painting reflects influences from photography and contemporary urban transformations during Haussmann's Paris. Widely thought to be lost after World War II, the painting was revealed in 1994 to be part of a collection looted by Soviet forces, later displayed at the Hermitage Museum in the controversial "Hidden Treasures Revealed" exhibition. It remains in the Hermitage's collection today.

== Composition ==
=== Subjects and setting ===
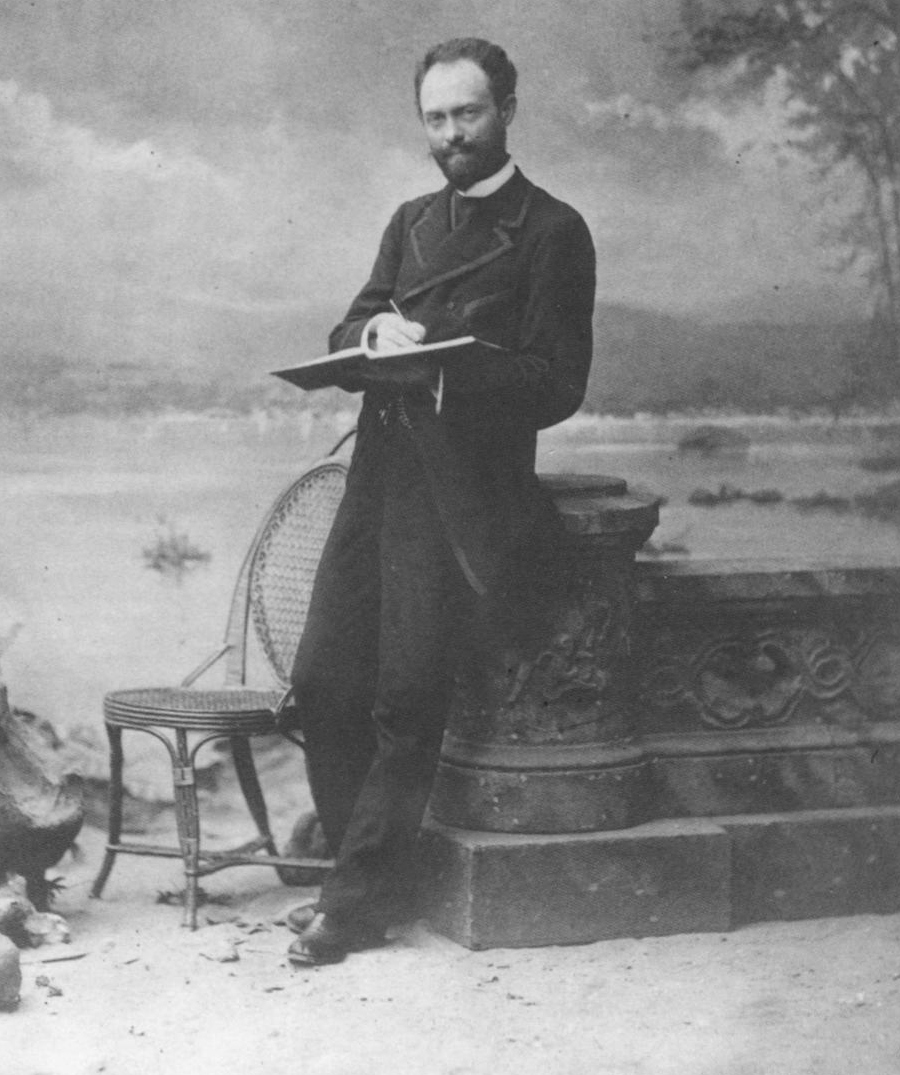
Ludovic Lepic c. 1874. Photograph by Nadar.

Edgar Degas's painting Place de la Concorde depicts Ludovic-Napoléon Lepic, his two daughters Eylau and Jeanine, and their dog Albrecht, crossing the Place de la Concorde in Paris, France. In the painting, Lepic walks through the square carelessly as his daughters move in the opposite direction. He is dressed fashionably, and he holds his umbrella under his arm and his cigar in his mouth as he walks. All of these details portray Lepic as the archetypal flâneur. The red patch on his overcoat indicates his rank in the Legion of Honour. The tall, solitary man on the left edge of the painting has been identified as the playwright Ludovic Halévy, who was also a close friend of Degas's until the Dreyfus affair.

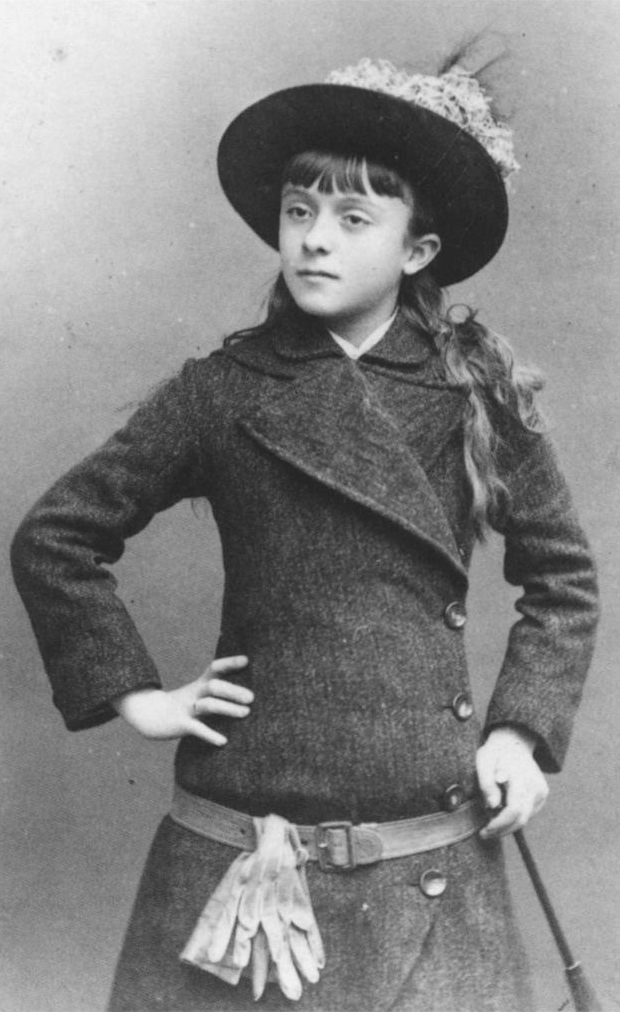
Eylau Lepic c. 1876 – c. 1877. Photograph by Nadar.

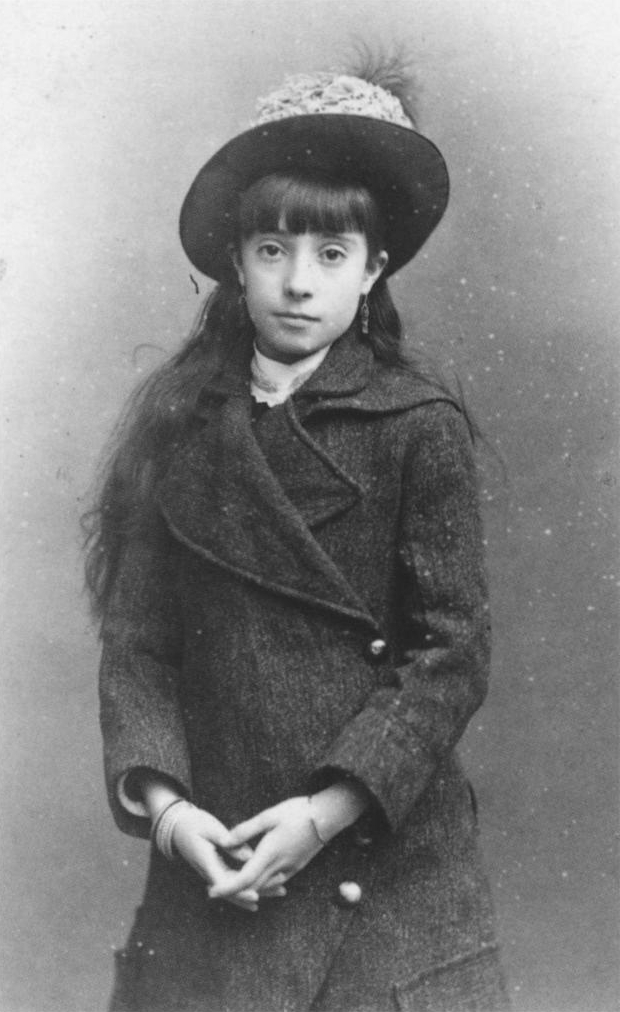
Jeanine Lepic c. 1876 – c. 1877. Photograph by Nadar.

The painting has been noted for accurately capturing the two girls' individual personalities. In the painting, Eylau, the older of the two girls, stands more confidently than her younger sister. Similarly, in a c. 1876-77 photograph, she stands in a tomboyish manner with her hands on her hips. Eylau was named after the Battle of Eylau, in which Ludovic Lepic's grandfather, General Joseph-Louis Lepic, fought in 1807. In the painting, Jeanine, the younger of the two girls, stands tentatively with her father. In an c. 1876-77 photograph, she stands in a more proper and stereotypically ladylike manner than her older sister.

In the background of the painting to the right, behind the wall, is the Tuileries Garden. The building visible in the background to the left is the Hôtel de la Marine, which at the time housed the French Ministry of the Navy. Also in the background are two monuments dedicated to the cities of Lille and Strasbourg which feature sculptures by James Pradier. At the center-top of painting in the background is the monument dedicated to the city of Lille. Toward the right and almost entirely obscured by Lepic's hat is the monument dedicated to the city of Strasbourg. At the time that Degas created the painting, the monument to Strasbourg would have been draped in black to mourn the loss of the city to Prussia in the Franco-Prussian War. Depictions of urban exteriors such as in Place de la Concorde are rare in Edgar Degas's oeuvre.

=== Compositional alterations ===
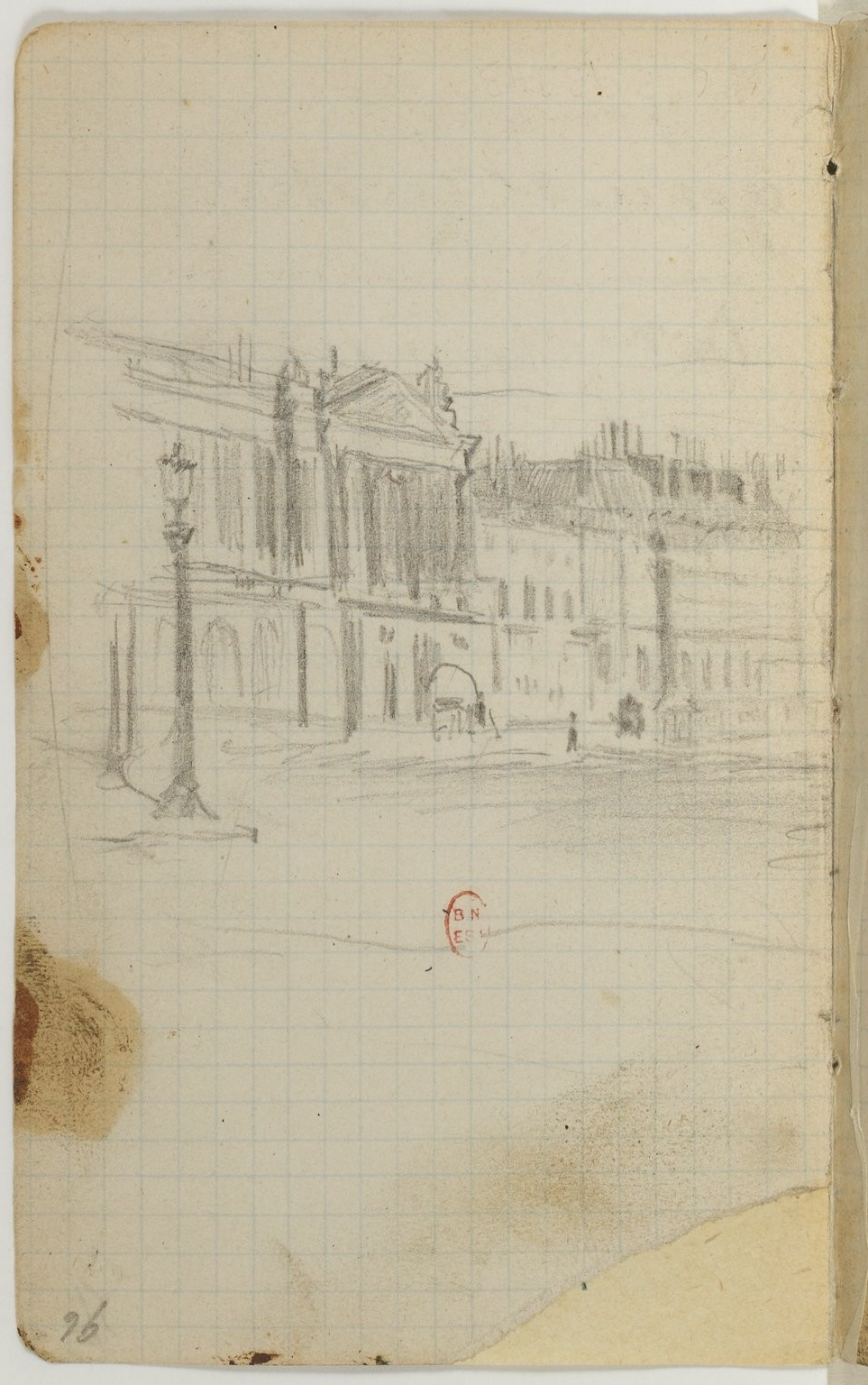
Edgar Degas's study for Place de la Concorde, c. 1875.

The painting has been altered from its original format. A six or seven centimeter section of canvas has been folded behind the stretcher along the lower edge. The lower edge of the canvas has also been cut, which probably removed the signature. These modification were made by Degas himself after the painting had been well dried, most likely before the painting was sent to the gallery of Paul Durand-Ruel.

Additionally, Ludovic Lepic's two daughters overlap his umbrella and his dog. Infrared and x-ray examinations of the painting revealed that both the umbrella and the dog were both fully completed underneath the two daughters, which could suggest that the daughters were not present in the painting's original composition.

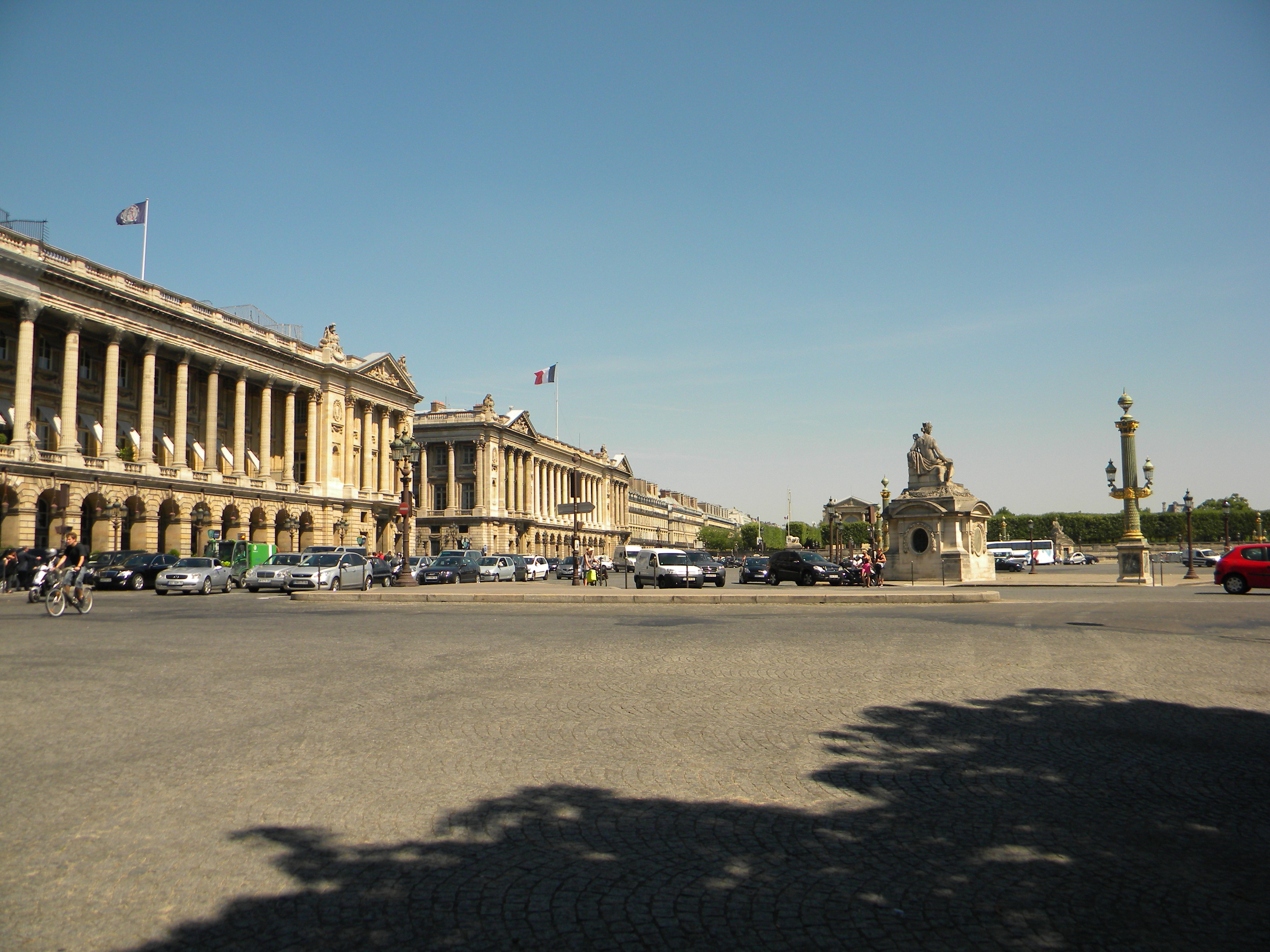
A photograph of the Place de la Concorde in 2010.

The solitary man who has been partially cropped out of frame has been observed as being unusually tall. In a preparatory study that Degas made for the painting, there is a lamp post in the position where the man stands in the painting. An on location observation of the Place de la Concorde, which has changed very little since the 1870s, from the same vantage point as the painting also reveals that there is a lamp post in the man's position. Further investigation suggests that the solitary man on the left side of the painting underwent significant transformation. Initially depicted with exaggerated, elongated features that resembled a lamppost, his figure was later refined to appear more natural and human.

=== Influence from photography ===
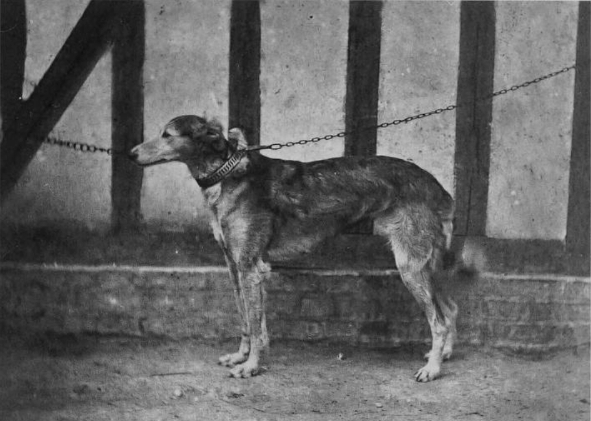
A photograph of Ludovic-Napoléon Lepic's dog Albrecht.

Many art historians believe that the large amount of negative space, the cropping, and the way in which the figures are facing in random directions were influenced by photography. Art historian Aaron Scharf, for example, compared Place de la Concorde, as well as some of Degas's other paintings, to a series of photographs titled Vues instantanées de Paris by photographer Hippolyte Jouvin. Many of Jouvin's photographs feature human figures and horse drawn carriages that are partially cropped out of frame in a similar manner to Degas's paintings, including Place de la Concorde. Additionally, there exists a photograph of Ludovic Lepic's dog Albrecht in a very similar position to that of the painting. It is probable that Degas used the photograph as a reference.

However, some scholars challenge the extent of photography's influence on Degas's work. Art historian Kirk Varnedoe argues that while Place de la Concorde features compositional elements such as cropping and asymmetry that resemble photographic techniques, these choices were not directly derived from photography. Instead, Varnedoe suggests that Degas's use of unconventional framing and perspective reflects a broader tradition of artistic experimentation that predates the widespread influence of photography.

== Social and political symbolism ==
Art historians have frequently noted the dramatic cropping and large amount of negative space in Edgar Degas's Place de la Concorde. In the painting, Lepic and his two daughters are cropped out of frame at the waist. Another figure, a solitary man with a cane, is half cropped out of frame. Between the figures and the buildings is a large amount of negative space representing a nearly empty street. The dramatic cropping, the downward perspective, and asymmetrical composition may have been influenced by Japanese Ukiyo-e prints, of which Degas was known to be a collector.

The large negative space, however, may have a deeper symbolic significance. Some historians including André Dombrowski believe it reflects the socio-political fragmentation of France following the Franco-Prussian War and the Paris Commune. According to Dombrowski, the disconnection between the figures and the vast emptiness of the square suggests not only physical separation but also social and political disunity, emblematic of the challenges faced by the early Third Republic.

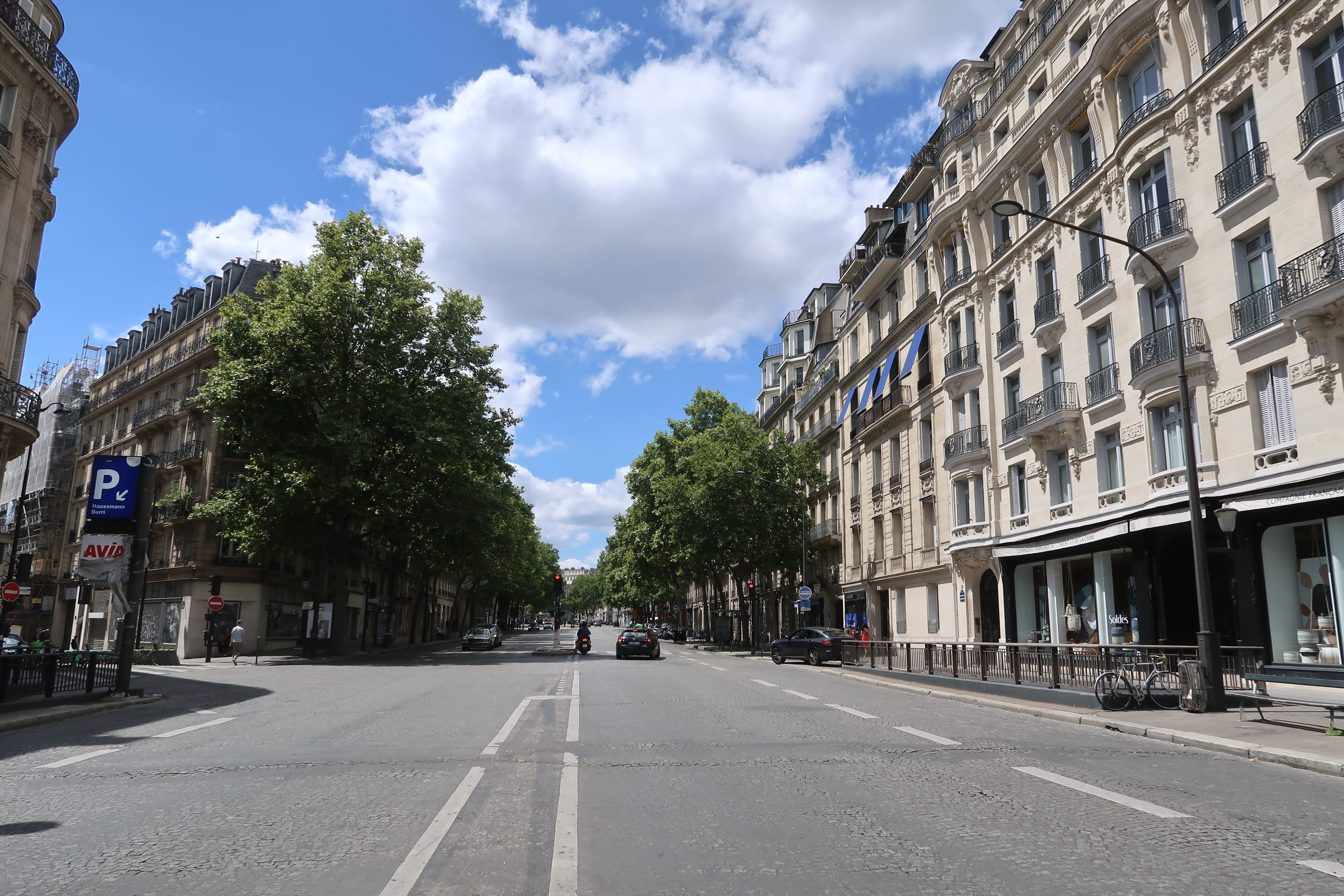
Example of Haussmann's renovation of boulevards

Alternative interpretations of the composition highlight its reflection of urban transformation and class dynamics in Haussmann’s Paris. The painting's off-center arrangement and dramatic use of negative space have been interpreted as a commentary on the alienation and fragmentation of modern urban life. During this time, Paris was transformed by Haussmann’s renovations, which created wide avenues and public squares but also displaced many communities. This new urban design brought people physically closer but often left them feeling socially distant. The painting’s scattered figures, each looking in different directions, may reflect this sense of isolation.

Art historian Albert Boime believes that the painting reflects the attempts to symbolically "cleanse" and rehabilitate Paris after the Franco-Prussian War and the Paris Commune. The spaciousness and apparent disconnection of the figures may symbolize the restoration of a bourgeois-controlled public space, contrasting sharply with the barricaded and war-torn streets of the Commune era.

== Provenance and exhibition history ==
Despite being the painting's subject, Place de la Concorde was never owned by Ludovic Lepic and Edgar Degas likely did not paint it for him. The painting remained in the possession of Degas, who never exhibited it on his own, until it was sold to Paul Durand-Ruel. In 1911, the German art collector Otto Gerstenberg purchased the painting from Durand-Ruel for 120,000 francs. The painting, along with the rest of Gerstenberg's collection, was left to his daughter Margarete Scharf after his death in 1935. In 1943, during World War II, most of Gerstenberg's art collection was stored in the bunker of the Nationalgalerie in Berlin. The rest of the collection was stored elsewhere in the Victoria firm and was destroyed in an air raid. After the war, the surviving paintings of Gerstenberg's collection were looted by the Soviet Union.

Place de la Concorde had been assumed to have been destroyed for almost five decades following World War II. In 1994, the Hermitage Museum publicly announced that it was in possession of more than 70 French Impressionist and Post-Impressionist paintings that had been looted from private German collections by the Soviet Union during the war. Along with Edgar Degas's Place de la Concorde, the Hermitage Museum announced it was in possession of paintings by other artists including Paul Cézanne, Honoré Daumier, Henri de Toulouse-Lautrec, Claude Monet, Camille Pissarro, Pierre-Auguste Renoir, and Vincent van Gogh. The paintings had been locked in small storage room on the second floor of the museum, and had only been known to a handful of museum personnel. Mikhail Piotrovsky, the Hermitage Museum's director, had only seen the paintings for the first time in 1991.

In 1995, the Hermitage Museum held an exhibition titled Hidden Treasures Revealed which displayed 74 looted paintings, including Edgar Degas's Place de la Concorde. The painting had been taken from the collection of Otto Gerstenberg. Nearly 600,000 people attended the exhibition in the first few months of the show. The exhibition Hidden Treasures Revealed proved to be controversial due to its displaying looted artworks. Following the fall of the Soviet Union, the Hermitage Museum sought to become more open with the rest of the world by displaying these previously hidden artworks. Despite previous agreements between Russia and Germany in 1990 and 1992 to return unlawfully looted artworks, Russian officials argued that only artworks stolen by individual soldiers could be considered unlawfully taken, and that artworks taken under official orders did not need to be returned to their previous owners. To this day, Place de la Concorde remains in the collection of the Hermitage Museum.

== See also ==
- Count Lepic and His Daughters – an earlier 1871 painting of the Lepic family by Edgar Degas.
- At the Races in the Countryside – another painting by Edgar Degas which has been argued to show influence from photography.
- Otto Krebs – a German art collector. Paintings from his looted collection were also featured in the exhibition Hidden Treasures Revealed.

== Bibliography ==
- Buchanan, Harvey (1997). "Edgar Degas and Ludovic Lepic: An Impressionist Friendship". Cleveland Studies in the History of Art. 2. Cleveland Museum of Art: 32–121. ISSN 1092-3934. JSTOR 20079691. Archived from the original on 13 March 2024.
- Crisci-Richardson, Roberta (2015). Mapping Degas: Real Spaces, Symbolic Spaces and Invented Spaces in the Life and Work of Edgar Degas (1834-1917). Newcastle upon Tyne, UK: Cambridge Scholars Publishing. ISBN 978-1-4438-7449-6.
- Kostenevich, Albert (1995). Hidden Treasures Revealed: Impressionist Masterpieces and Other Important French Paintings Preserved by The State Hermitage Museum, St. Petersburg. New York: Harry N. Abrams, Inc. ISBN 0-8109-3432-9.
