= At the Races in the Countryside =

1869 painting by Edgar Degas

- Aux courses en province (French)
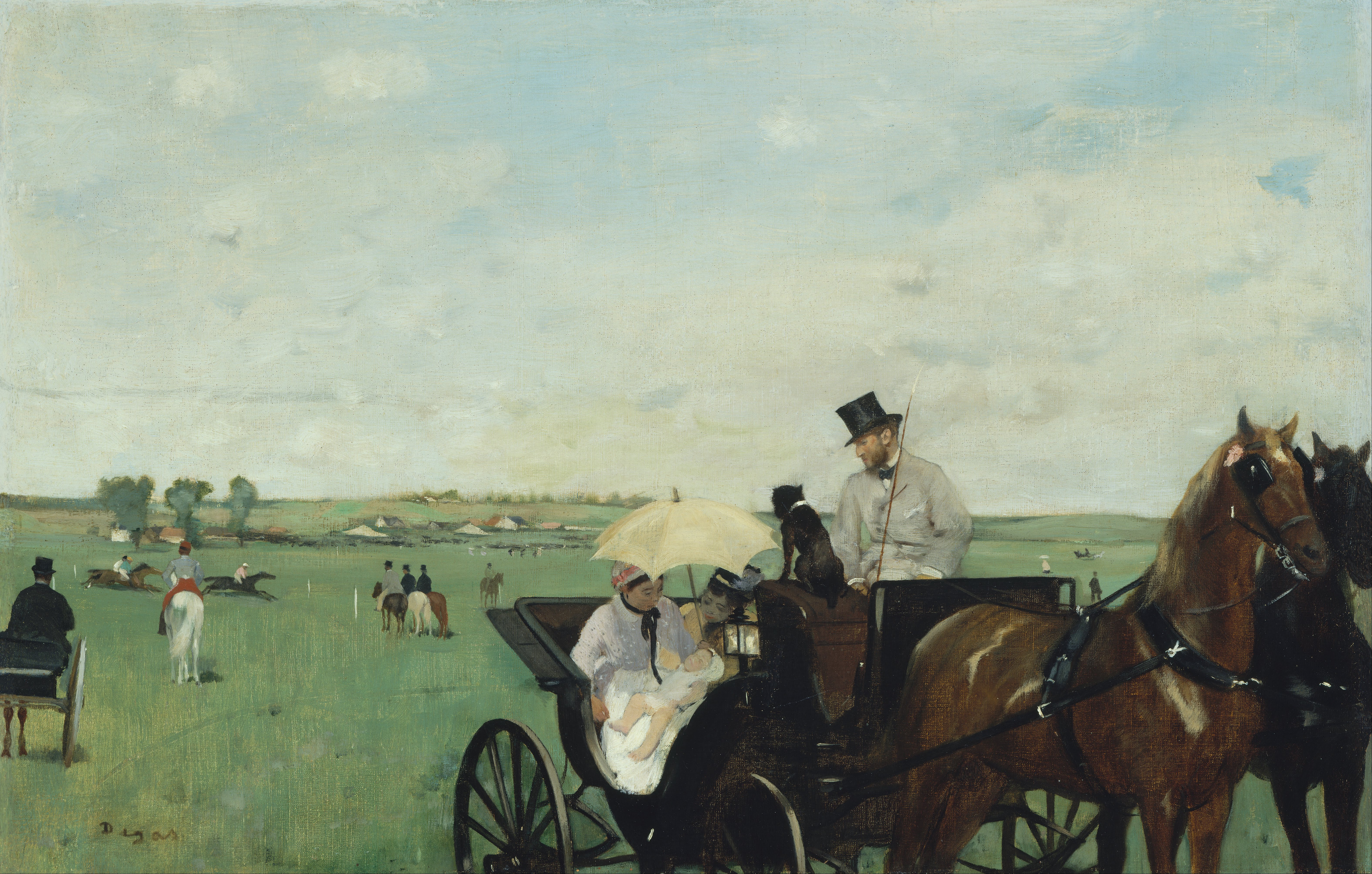
- Artist: Edgar Degas
- Year: 1869
- Medium: Oil on canvas
- Movement: Impressionism
- Dimensions: 36.5 cm × 55.9 cm (14.4 in × 22.0 in)
- Location: Museum of Fine Arts Boston, Boston

At the Races in the Countryside or Carriage at the Races is an oil on canvas painting by the French painter Edgar Degas, from 1869. The painting, which depicts a scene of a family in a horse-drawn carriage in the countryside, is on display at the Museum of Fine Arts Boston. The painting was shown at the First Impressionist Exhibition in 1874.

== Background ==
In the summer of 1869, Edgar Degas visited Paul Valpinçon, an old childhood friend, at his estate in Ménil-Hubert. Valpinçon's son Henri had been born in January of the same year. At the Races in the Countryside depicts the Valpinçon family during an outing to the races in Argentan, fifteen kilometers from the Valpinçons's estate. Degas painted At the Races in the Countryside during his visit.

Degas also depicted members of the Valpinçon family in other paintings during his visits to their estate. The 1865 painting A Woman Seated beside a Vase of Flowers depicts the wife Paul Valpinçon. The 1871 painting Portrait of Mlle. Hortense Valpinçon depicts the daughter of Paul Valpinçon.

== Composition ==
At the Races in the Countryside is composed in such a way that it appears to have not been composed. The main focus of the painting, the Valpinçon family in their horse-drawn carriage, is placed off-center and fill most of the lower-right quarter of the picture. The lower halves of the wheels of the carriage are cropped out of the bottom of the picture. The lower halves of the two horses' legs are also cropped out of the bottom of the picture, as is half of one of the horse's face. On the left side of the painting in the background, another horse-drawn carriage is also partially cropped out of frame. This style of cropping makes the painting seem as if it were not a deliberate composition, but rather a snapshot of a scene that one has happened to stumble upon.

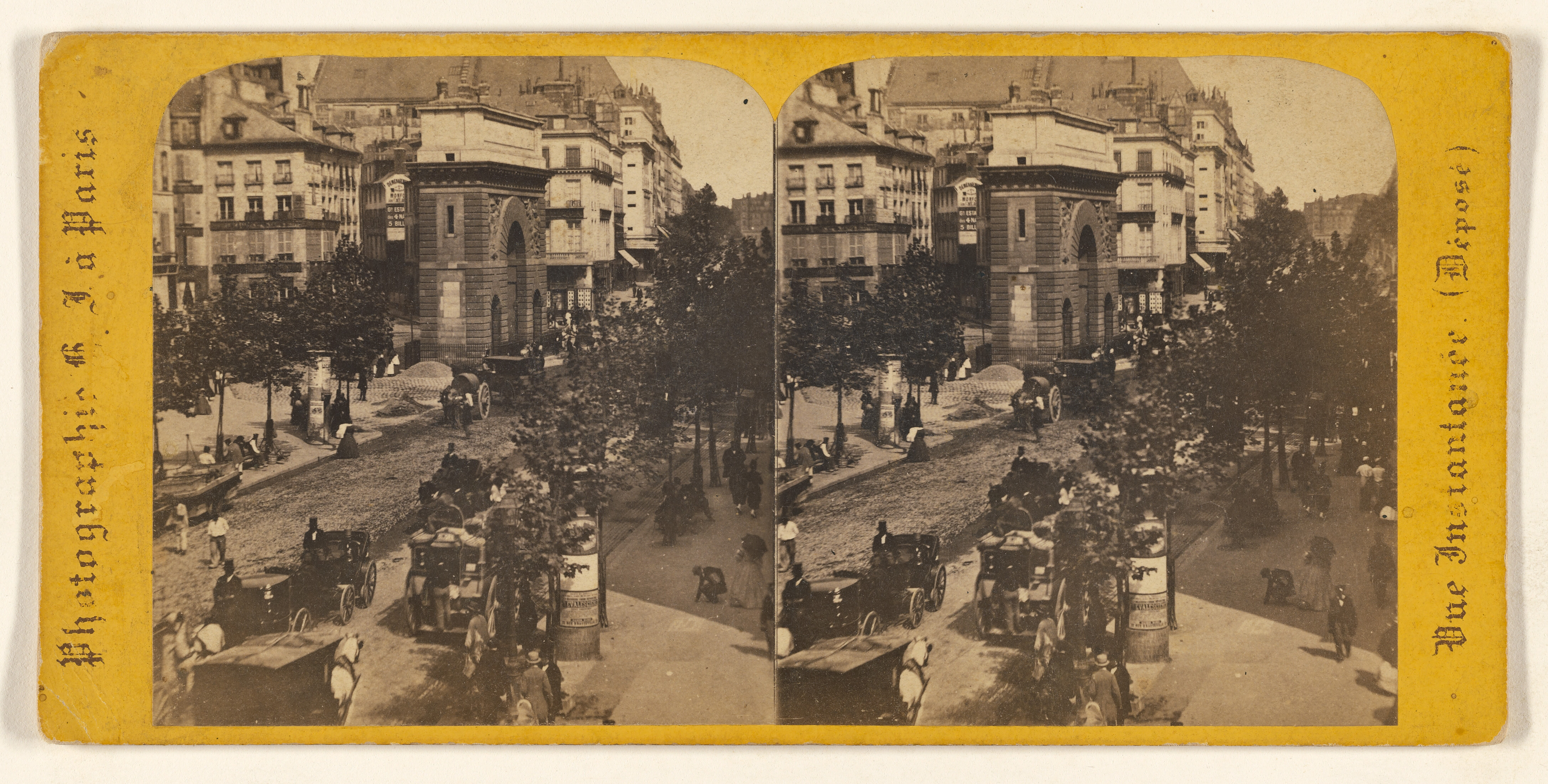
A sterioscopic photograph of the Porte Saint-Martin in Paris by Hippolyte Jouvin. Note the carriage in the lower-left corner that is partially cropped out of frame.

Many art historians believe that the manner in which the horses and carriages are cropped in the painting are the result of influence of photography. Art historian Aaron Scharf has compared this painting to an album of stereoscopic photographs called Vues instantanées de Paris taken by the photographer Hippolyte Jouvin. The photographs in the collection, taken between 1861 and 1865, show "instantaneous" views of the streets of Paris. In some of the photographs, horses and carriages are cropped out of frame in a similar way to the horses and carriage are in At the Races in the Countryside. Edgar Degas did not use this style of cropping in his horse racing scenes before 1862, which was when this style of cropping first started to appear in photographs. This style of cropping was uncommon in painting in general before the invention of photography.

Degas has also been suggested to have taken influences from English paintings when painting At the Races in the Countryside. The green coloring of the painting is suggestive of an influence from English horse racing scenes. The driver's top hat and the presence of the bulldog also contribute to the "English character" of the painting. English styles were fashionable among the French upper classes at the time of the painting's creation.

Other compositional features, such as the nearly flat horizon line and simplified houses, trees, and figures in the distance were influenced by imported Japanese woodblock prints.

== Exhibition history and provenance ==
Edgar Degas first sold At the Races in the Countryside to his art dealer, Paul Durand-Ruel, in September 1872. Less than a month later, Degas left Paris for New Orleans to visit relatives. In October, the painting was sent to London and shown at the Fifth Exhibition of the Society of French Artists. In November, while in New Orleans, Degas wrote to James Tissot to ask about how the painting had been received in London. The painting had been purchased by the French singer and art collector Jean-Baptiste Faure. That Degas inquired that continued to inquire about the painting even after having sold it suggests that he had an attachment to it.

Edgar Degas included At the Races in the Countryside at the first Impressionist exhibition at 35 Boulevard des Capucines in 1874. Ernest Chesneau gave the painting a positive review, saying that it was "exquisite in color, drawing, the felicity of the poses, and overall finish."

In 1893, Faure sold At the Races in the Countryside back to Durand-Ruel. In 1926, Durand-Ruel sold the painting to the Museum of Fine Arts Boston for $30,000. The painting has remained as a part of the museum's collection ever since.

== See also ==
- Place de la Concorde – another painting by Edgar Degas that has been said to exhibit photographic influences
- Before the Race – another horse racing scene painted by Edgar Degas during a stay with the Valpinçons
- Impression, Sunrise – an important painting by Claude Monet that was also shown at the first Impressionist exhibition
