= Valley with Ploughman Seen from Above =

Painting by Vincent van Gogh

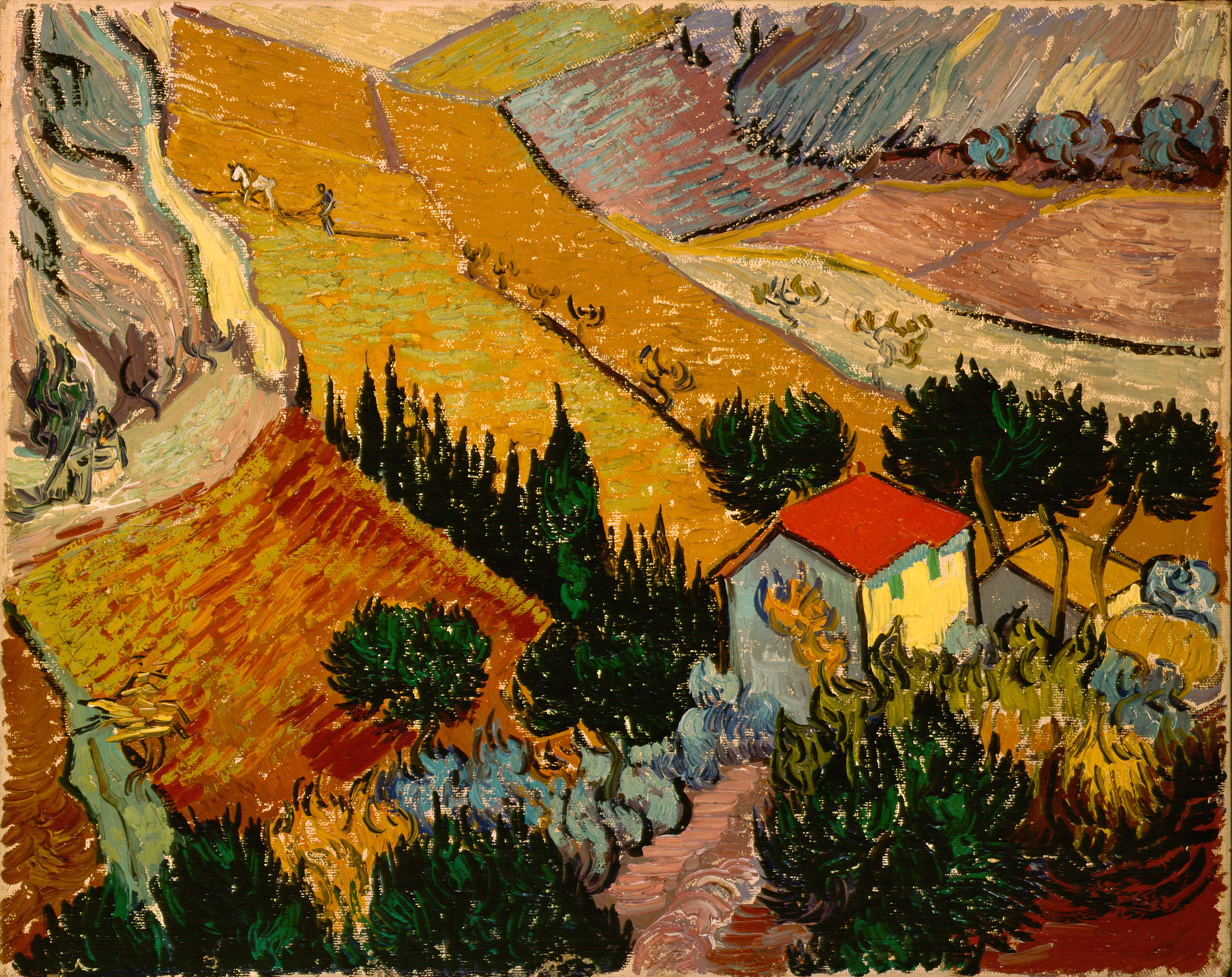
- Artist: Vincent van Gogh
- Year: 1889년 12월 1일
- Catalogue: F727; JH1877
- Medium: oil on canvas
- Dimensions: 33 cm × 41.4 cm (13 in × 16.3 in)
- Location: Hermitage Museum, Saint Petersburg

Valley with Ploughman Seen from Above or Landscape with House and Ploughman (Dutch - Landschap met een huis en een ploeger in vogelvlucht gezien) is an 1889 oil on canvas painting by Vincent van Gogh, produced during the autumn of his stay in Saint-Rémy. Its catalogue numbers are F 727 and JH 1877. It is now in the Hermitage Museum.

During the 1920s it was in the collection of Otto Krebs (1873–1941), a German industrialist, but was considered lost until 1995, when it appeared in an exhibition of 74 artworks looted by the Soviet Union at the end of World War Two, also including three other van Goghs, six Monets, seven Cezannes, two Gauguins and other works by Degas, Toulouse-Lautrec and Picasso, all from pre-war German private collections, mainly that of Krebs. The work has been on display at the Hermitage since then, which since 1996 has begun regular publishing of material on looted works still in its collections.

== See also ==
- List of works by Vincent van Gogh
