= Hippolyte Jouvin =

19th-century French photographer

- Born: 1825; Clinchamp, France
- Died: 1889 (aged 63–64); Paris, France
- Known for: Stereoscopic Photography

Hippolyte Jouvin (1825–1889) was a French photographer and publisher of stereoscopic photographs. He is considered a pioneer in the field of photogravure, and was one of the first photographers to use wet collodion process.

In 1863, he published a series of over two hundred stereoscopic photographs titled Vues instantanées de Paris ("instant views of Paris"). The term "instant" refers to the fast exposure time which allowed for the capture of people in the streets. With earlier large format cameras, long exposure times would have rendered the streets of Paris as empty. In 1867, Jouvin won a gold medal at the Paris Exposition Universelle for his photogravures.

Art historians have argued that Jouvin's Vues instantanées de Paris may have been a source of inspiration to the Impressionists. Art historian Aaron Scharf compared the elevated viewpoints in some of the paintings of Gustave Caillebotte to the elevated viewpoints of Jouvin's photographs. Scharf also compared the style of cropping in Edgar Degas's paintings Place de la Concorde and At the Races in the Countryside to the cropped figures and carriages in Jouvin's photographs.

Hippolyte Jouvin's photographs are present in the collections of the Bibliothèque nationale de France, the Library of Congress, the J. Paul Getty Museum, and the George Eastman Museum.

== Gallery ==
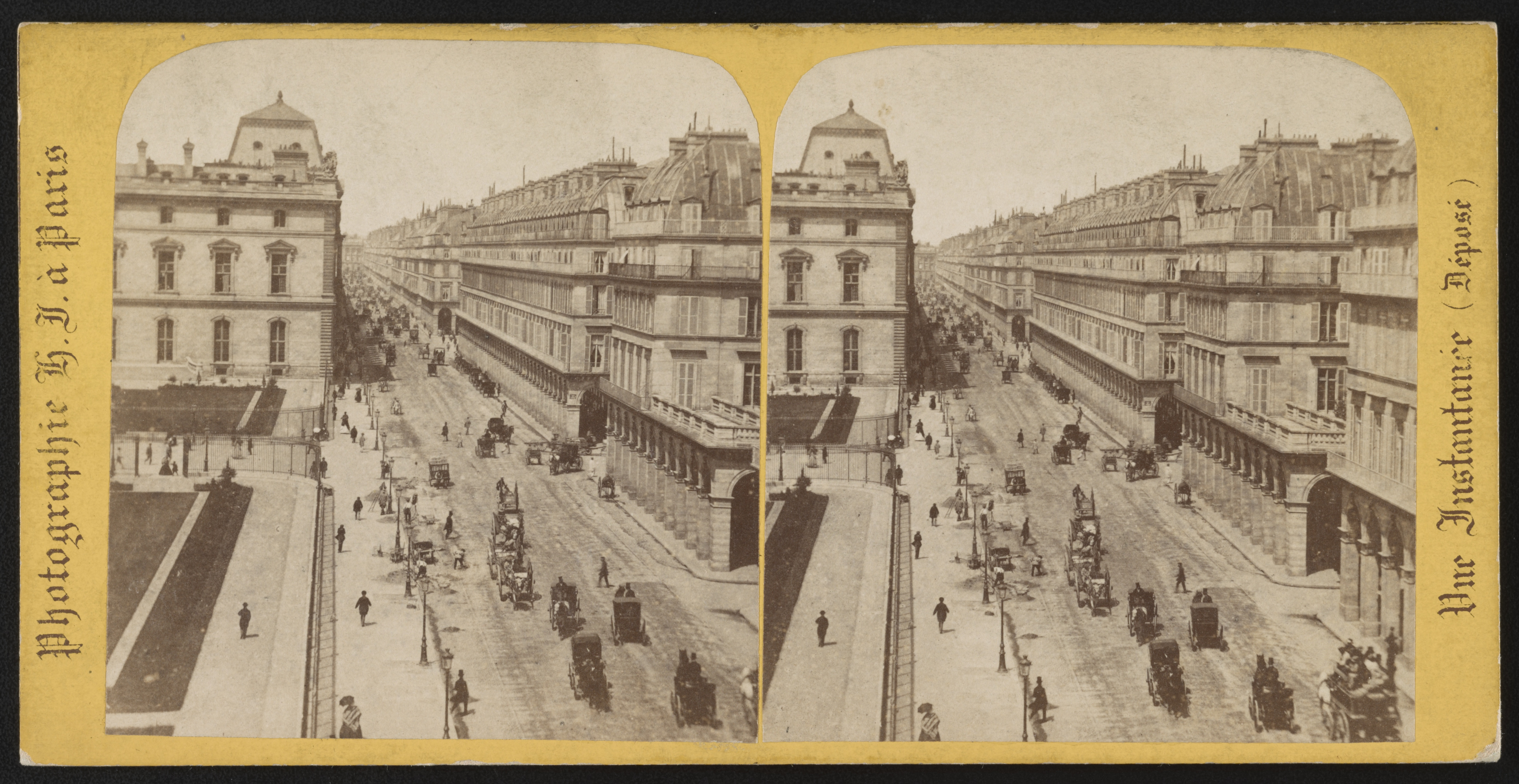
Rue de Rivoli et hôtel du Louvre

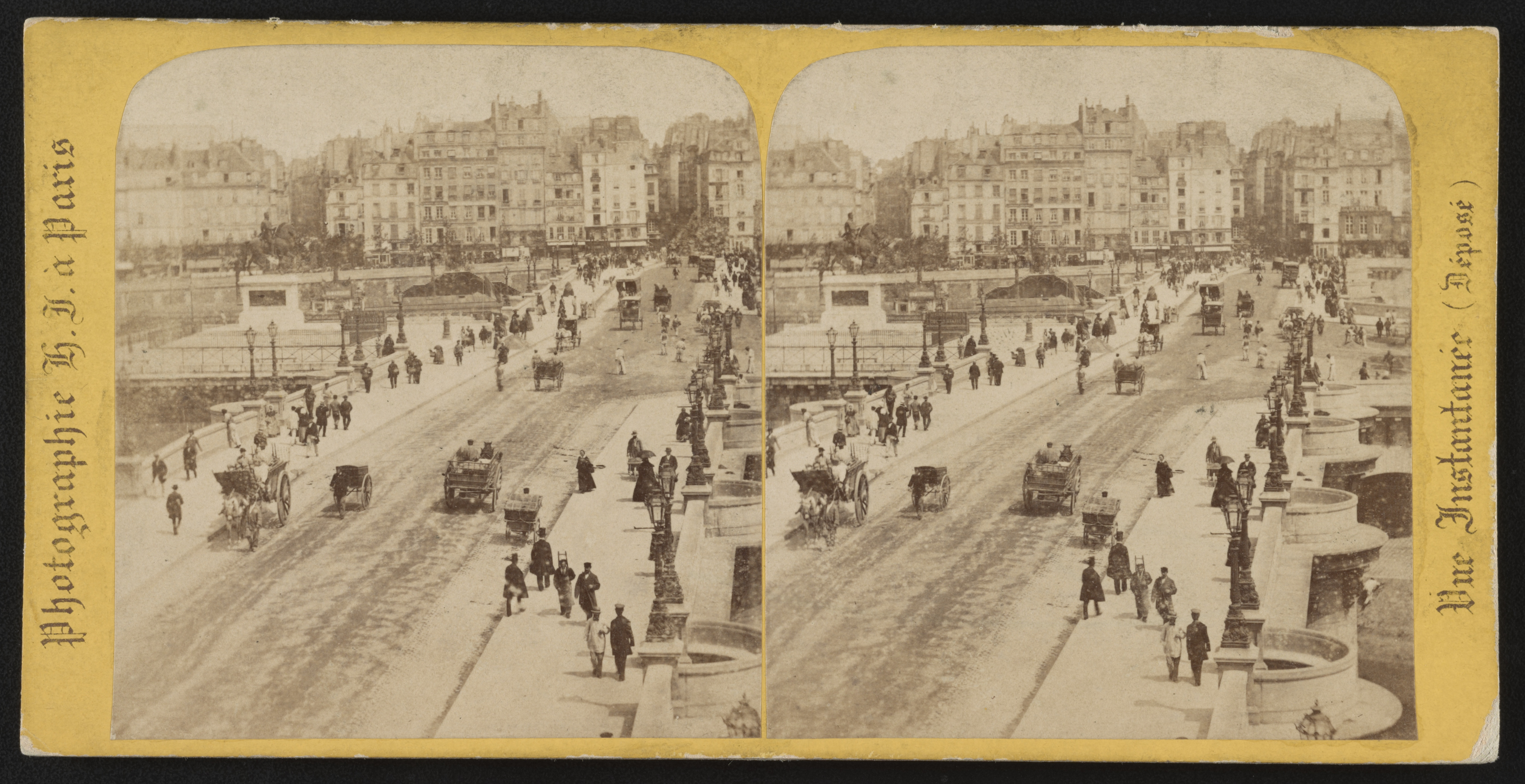
Le Pont-Neuf, vu du quai des Grands Augustins

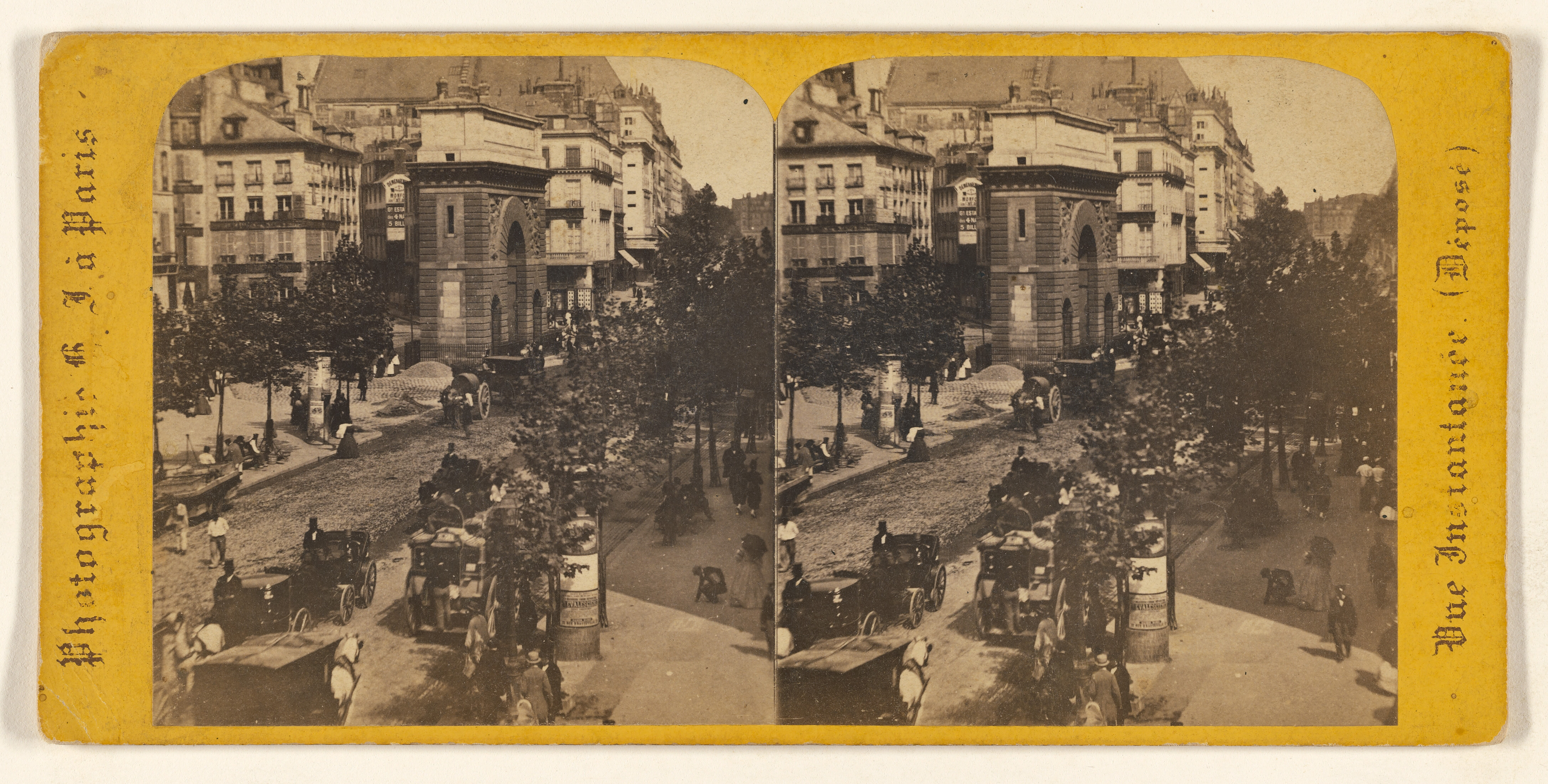
Vue Instantanée de Paris, Porte Saint-Martin.
