= The Grand Quai at Le Havre =

Painting by Claude Monet

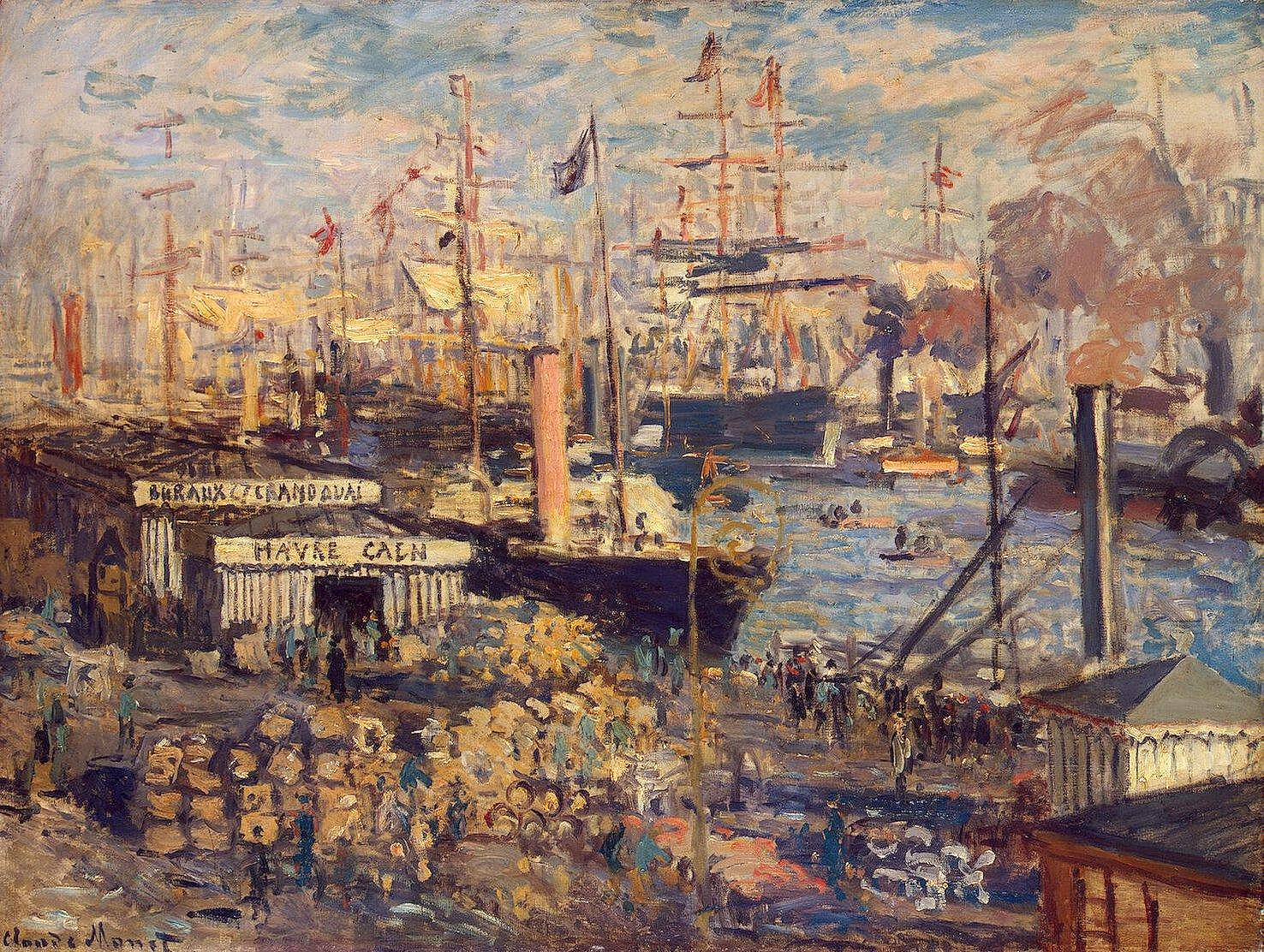
The Grand Quai at Le Havre (1874), Hermitage Museum.

The Grand Quai at Le Havre is an incomplete 1874 oil on canvas painting by Claude Monet, now in the Otto Krebs collection at the Hermitage Museum.

Monet stayed in his birthplace of Le Havre in autumn 1874 to prepare for a future exhibition. The work shows the city's Grand Quai (main quay) with its administrative offices, bales of merchandise and ships. He produced three other views of the city's port during his stay which are in the Los Angeles County Museum of Art, the Philadelphia Museum of Art and a private collection.

== See also ==
- List of paintings by Claude Monet
