= Poppy Field =

1890 painting by Vincent van Gogh

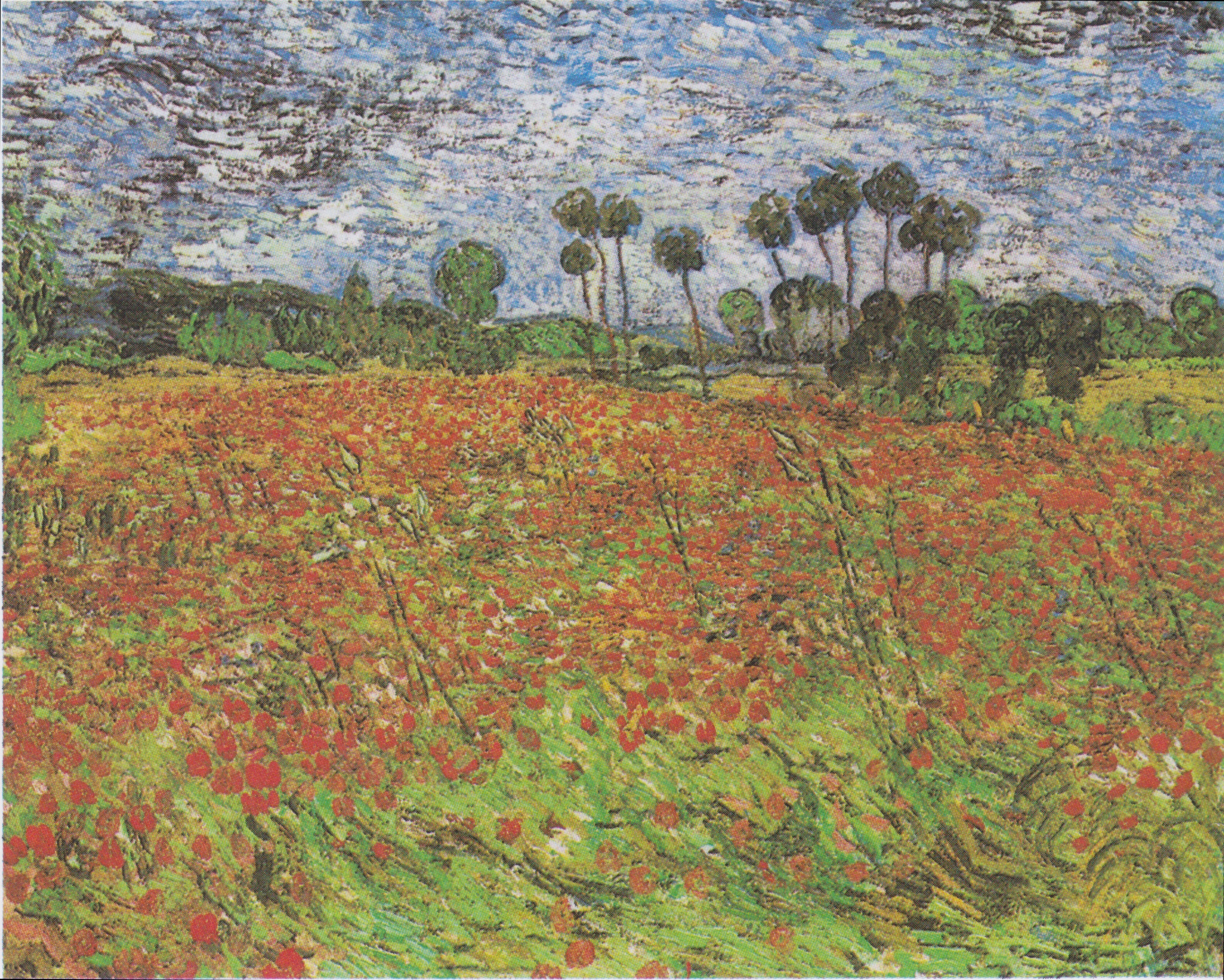
- Artist: Vincent van Gogh
- Year: 1890
- Catalogue: F636; JH2027
- Medium: oil on canvas
- Dimensions: 73 cm × 91.5 cm (29 in × 36.0 in)
- Location: Kunstmuseum Den Haag; Hague, Netherlands

Poppy Field is an 1890 painting by the Dutch artist Vincent van Gogh, painted around a month before his death during his stay in Auvers-sur-Oise, France. It has been described as "a composition that verges on the abstract" and shows marked difference from a 1888 painting of the same subject that now is in the Van Gogh Museum, in Amsterdam. Spending many years in Germany, the painting now hangs in the Kunstmuseum, in The Hague.

== Background ==
In May 1890, Van Gogh moved from southeastern France to the commune of Auvers-sur-Oise near Paris to be closer to psychiatrist Paul Gachet and his brother and financial supporter Theo. It is believed that Van Gogh completed the Poppy Field in June 1890, approximately one month before committing suicide. Other paintings completed in the final months of his life include Portrait of Dr. Gachet, The Church at Auvers, Wheatfield with Crows, and Tree Roots. During this time in Auvers-sur-Oise, Van Gogh completed more than 70 paintings, many focusing on northern scenes and “memories of the north.”

In the last months of his life, Van Gogh found consolation in painting fields and painted several wheat fields of Auvers-sur-Oise, most notably Wheatfield with Crows. In his last letter, Van Gogh described himself as "quite absorbed in the immense plain with wheat fields against the hills, boundless as a sea, delicate yellow, delicate soft green, the delicate violet of a dug-up and weeded piece of soil." Describing the landscape in Auvers-sur-Oise, Van Gogh wrote in a letter from July 1890 that he attempted to "express sadness, extreme loneliness" when painting "immense stretches of wheatfields under turbulent skies." Van Gogh continued describing the country's beneficial effects, writing, "These canvases will tell you what I can't say in words, what I consider healthy and fortifying about the countryside."

== Description ==
This oil on canvas painting features colors differentiated along horizontal bands, including a red and green field of poppies in the foreground, ragged masses of darker green trees along the horizon, and restless skies of varying blue hues above. The painting resembles Claude Monet’s Poppy Field of 1881 but has a much higher horizon, with the poppies dominating the space of the composition. Like many of his poppy paintings, the work juxtaposes brilliant red poppy blooms against alfalfa green, developing what Van Gogh called a “motif in red and green.” Regarding this color motif and others, Van Gogh wrote, “These are fundamentals, which one may subdivide further, and elaborate, but quite enough to show you without the help of a picture that there are colors which cause each other to shine brilliantly, which form a couple, which complete each other like man and woman.”

== Provenance ==
In 1911, German museum director Gustav Pauli, a proponent of modern art, purchased the painting from the art dealer Cassirer to be added to the collection at the Kunsthalle Bremen. Carl Vinnen and other Germans criticized the acquisition as part of a growing influence of and collusion with French art; the purchase additionally sparked the Vinnen Protest, also known as “A Protest by German Artists,” which expressed hostility towards French modernism. The painting was restored to Dutch ownership after World War II, in 1948, after being acquired by the Nazis. The work is currently on a long-term loan to the Kunstmuseum Den Haag in The Hague, Netherlands, by the Cultural Heritage Agency of the Netherlands; the Kunstmuseum expects to restore the work to its original private owners.

== Gallery ==
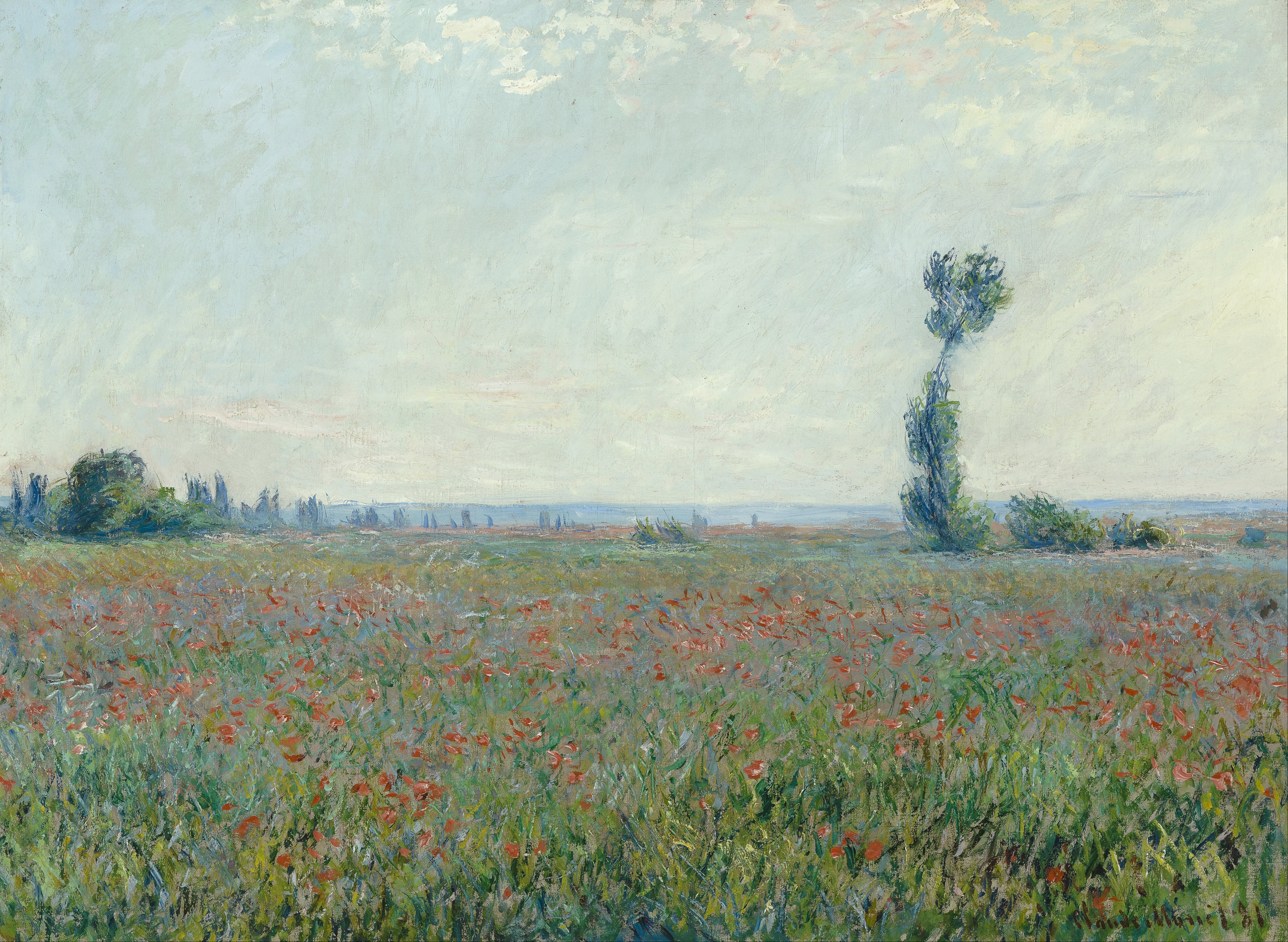
Claude Monet, Poppy Field (Champ de coquelicots), 1881

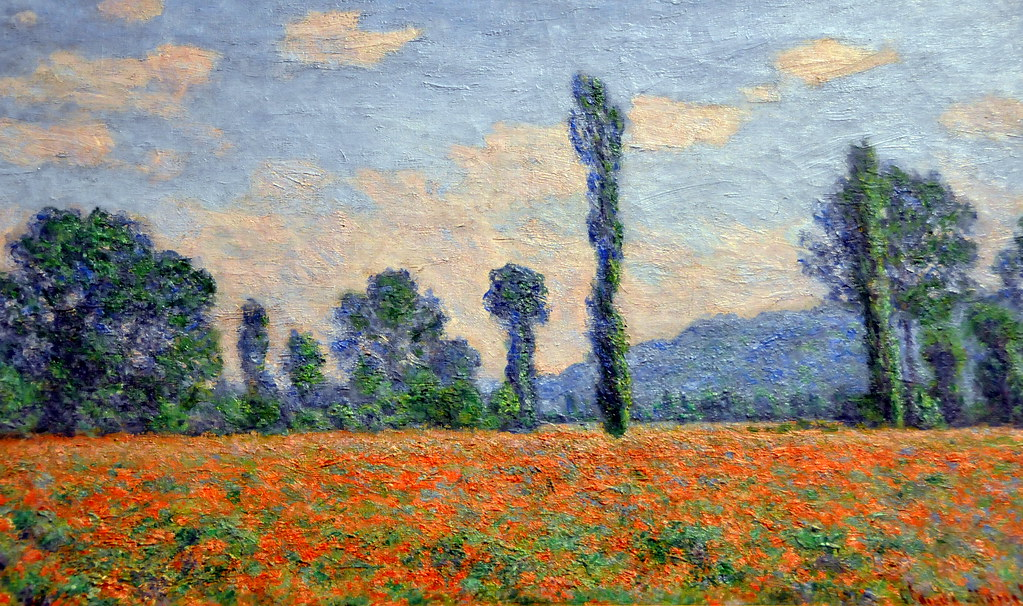
Claude Monet, Field of Poppies near Giverny, 1890

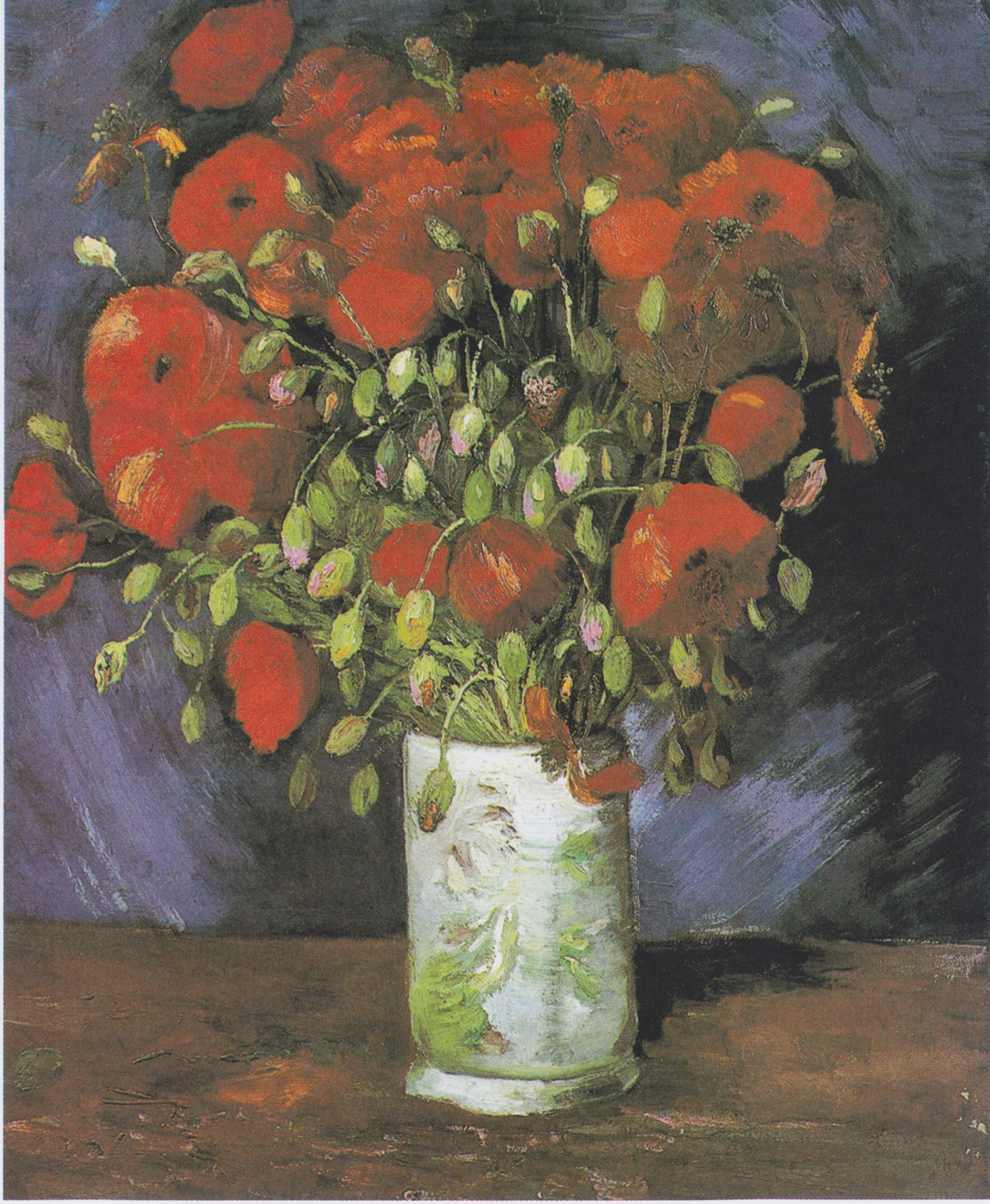
Vincent Van Gogh, Vase with Red Poppies, 1886, Paris

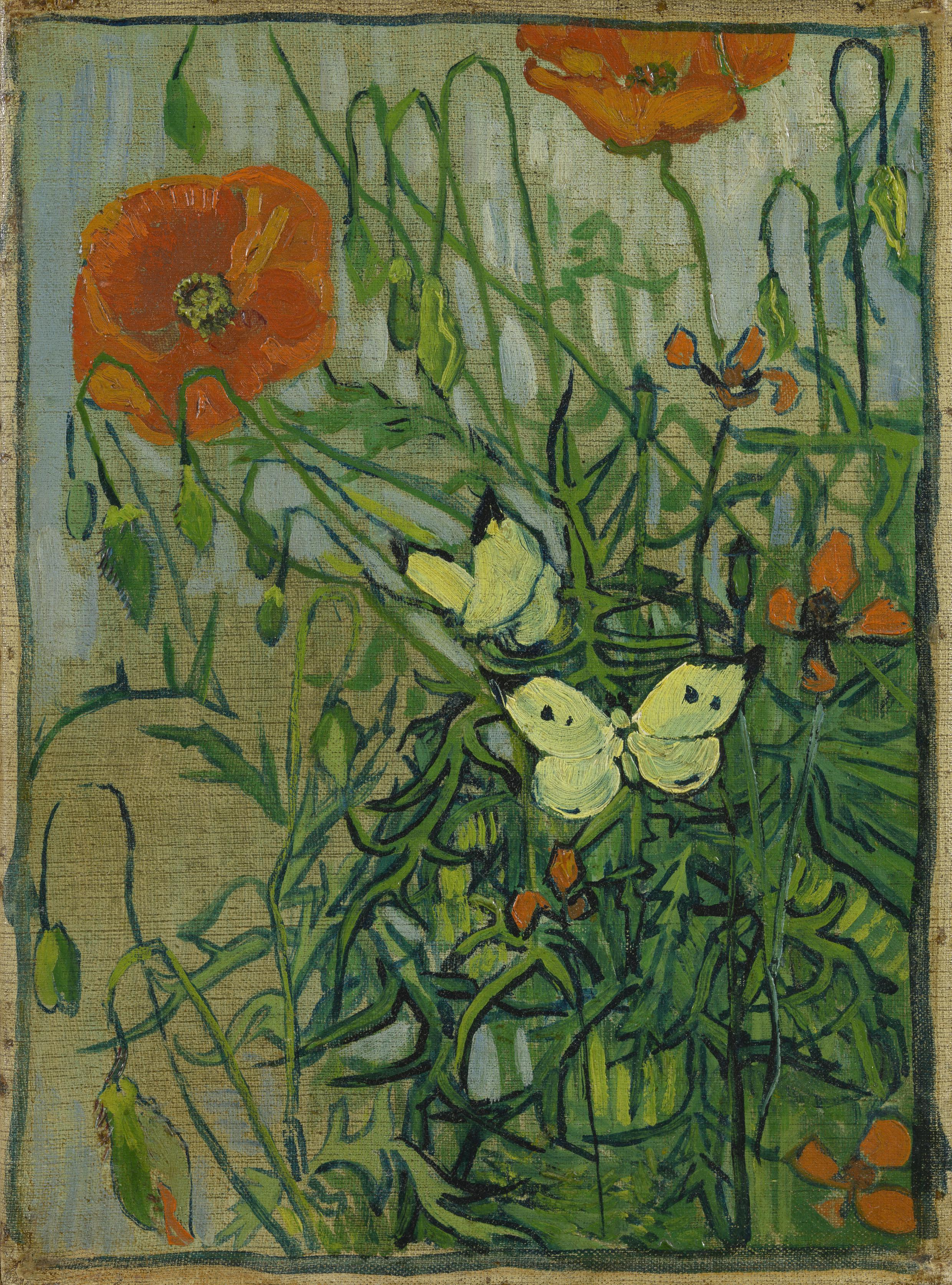
Vincent Van Gogh, Poppies and Butterflies, 1889

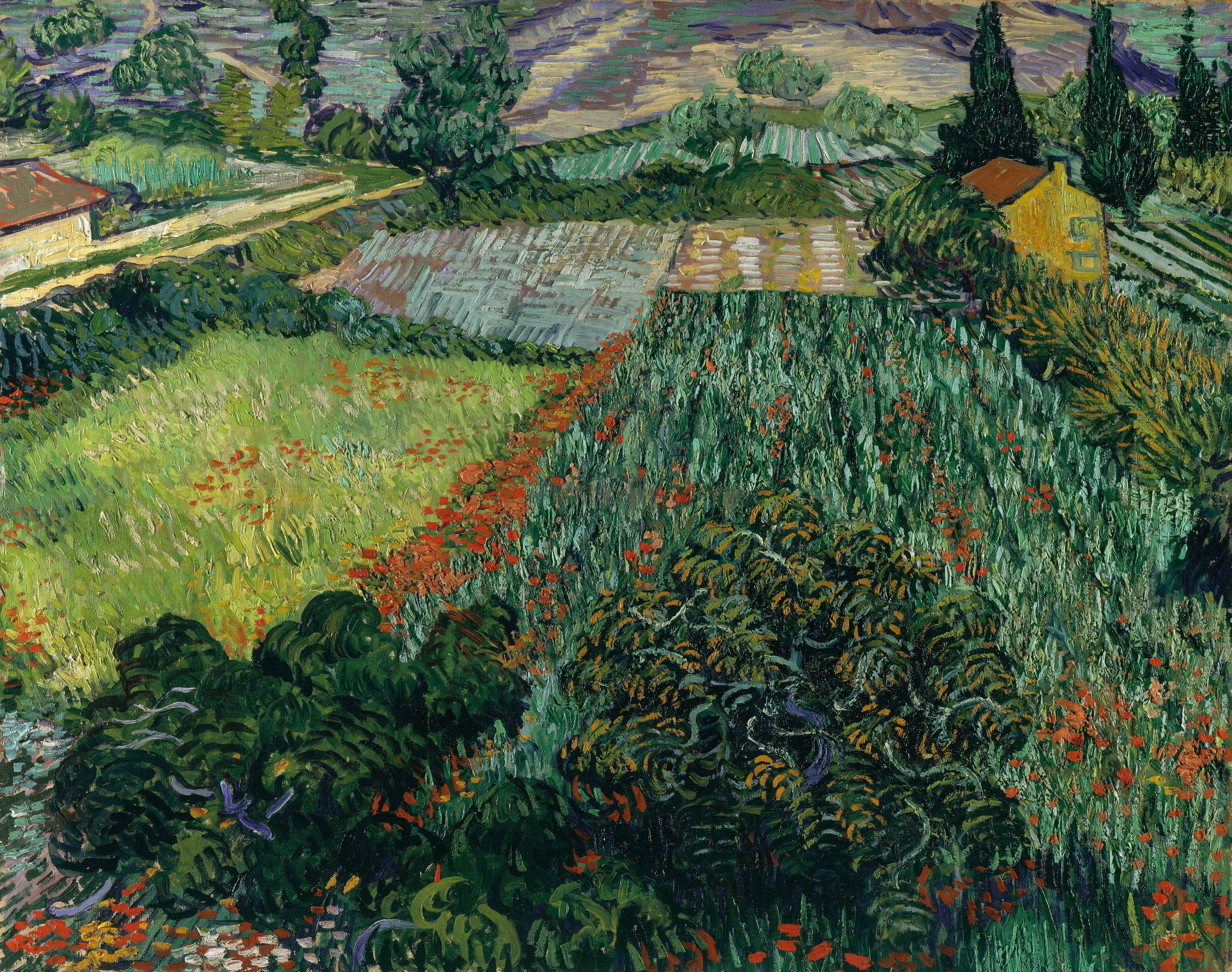
Vincent Van Gogh, Field with Poppies, 1889

== See also ==
- List of works by Vincent van Gogh
