= Otto Krebs =

German entrepreneur and art collector

Otto Krebs (25 March 1873 – 26 March 1941) was a German industrialist and major collector of late 19th and early 20th century French paintings, particularly those of Cézanne, Van Gogh and Gauguin. Seized by the Red Army and taken to Leningrad as war reparations, his collection is still housed at the Hermitage Museum in that city.

== Life ==
Born to a physics teacher (later a professor) in Wiesbaden, he studied at Berlin's Polytechnikum before studying philosophy in Zürich, where he completed his thesis in 1897. He then became commercial director of Rudolf Otto Meyer's firm in Hamburg, before setting up a new business in 1906 (Strebelwerke) in Mannheim which in time became among the best boiler manufacturers in Germany, particularly of steam boilers. His business success was due to engineer Joseph Strebel's 1903 discovery of building backward-flow steam boilers (Gegenstromgliederkessel-D.R.P. Nr. 76582). He became wealthy enough to start collecting in the 1920s, mainly buying works in Paris, especially from the art dealers Durand-Ruel and Bernheim-Jeune.

In 1917 he bought an estate in Holzdorf, a small village to the south of Weimar which he had got to know en route between his main factory in Mannheim and others in Bohemia and German Silesia. Building a holiday home there, he moved there permanently around 1930, using its reception rooms to house his art collection as well as Gobelins tapestries. He died of cancer at Holzdorf, leaving much of his estate to a foundation for cancer research which is now part of the University of Heidelberg's medical faculty and the house and grounds to his mistress and wife, the pianist Frieda Kwast-Hodapp. It was occupied by the Soviet Army staff after the Allied victory and the building's collections were taken to Leningrad as war reparations in 1947, but not displayed to the public until 1995.

== Collection ==
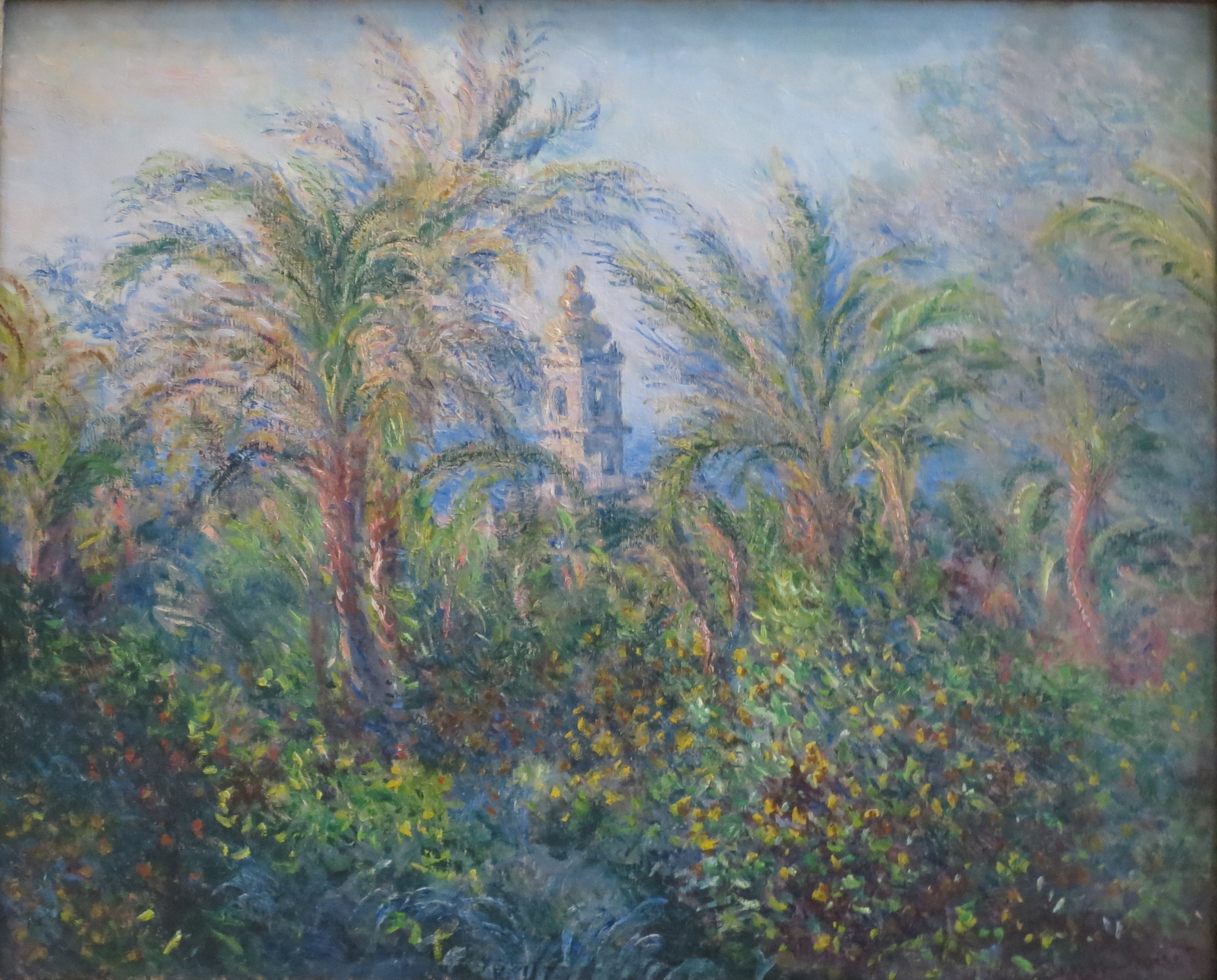
Claude Monet: Garden at Bordighera, Morning (1884), Hermitage Museum.

Otto Krebs launched his collection after he purchased the estate. It comprises antique objects as well as old furniture and modern paintings. While he appreciated the Romantic period, his collection is primarily based on late 19th century and 20th century works. Albert Kostenevitch compared his collection to that of the American Albert C. Barnes, but considered it to be of better quality, especially his Cézannes, seven paintings demonstrating all of the master's capabilities, in still lifes as well as in landscapes, portraits, or figurative compositions. Likewise, his collections of Van Gogh (four paintings including Portrait of Madame Trabuc, painted in September 1889) and Gauguin (two paintings, including The Two Sisters or Piti Teina, unknown until the 1995 Hermitage exhibition) are of exceptional quality. All the masterpieces are different and among them provide an overview of the highest achievements of the painting of that period. The collection also includes some Degas, six Monets, a Toulouse-Lautrec, some Pissarros, Picasso's The Absinthe Drinker, and Vuillard's Madame Vuillard in the Salon (1898).

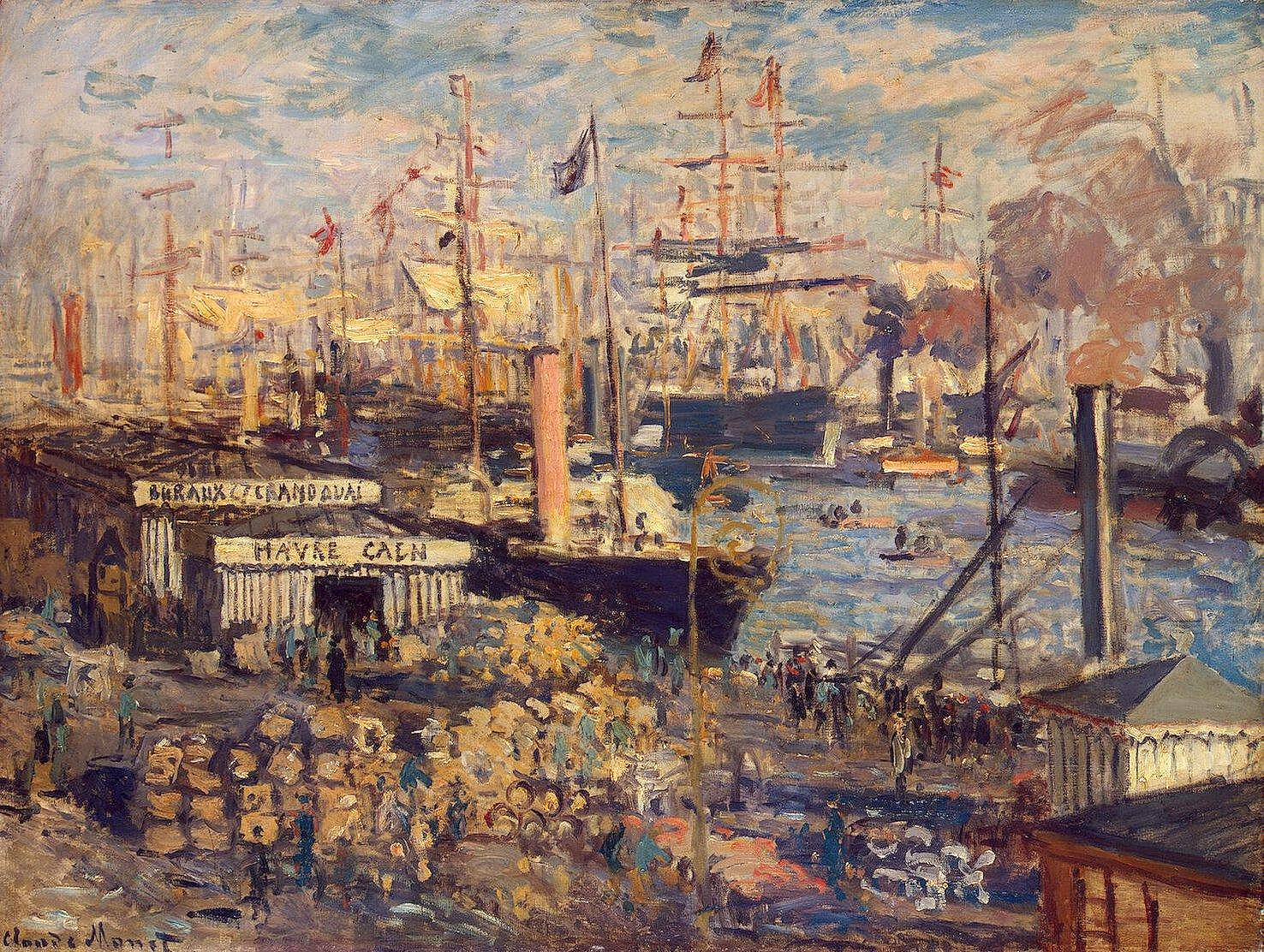
Monet: The Grand Quai at Le Havre (1874), Hermitage Museum

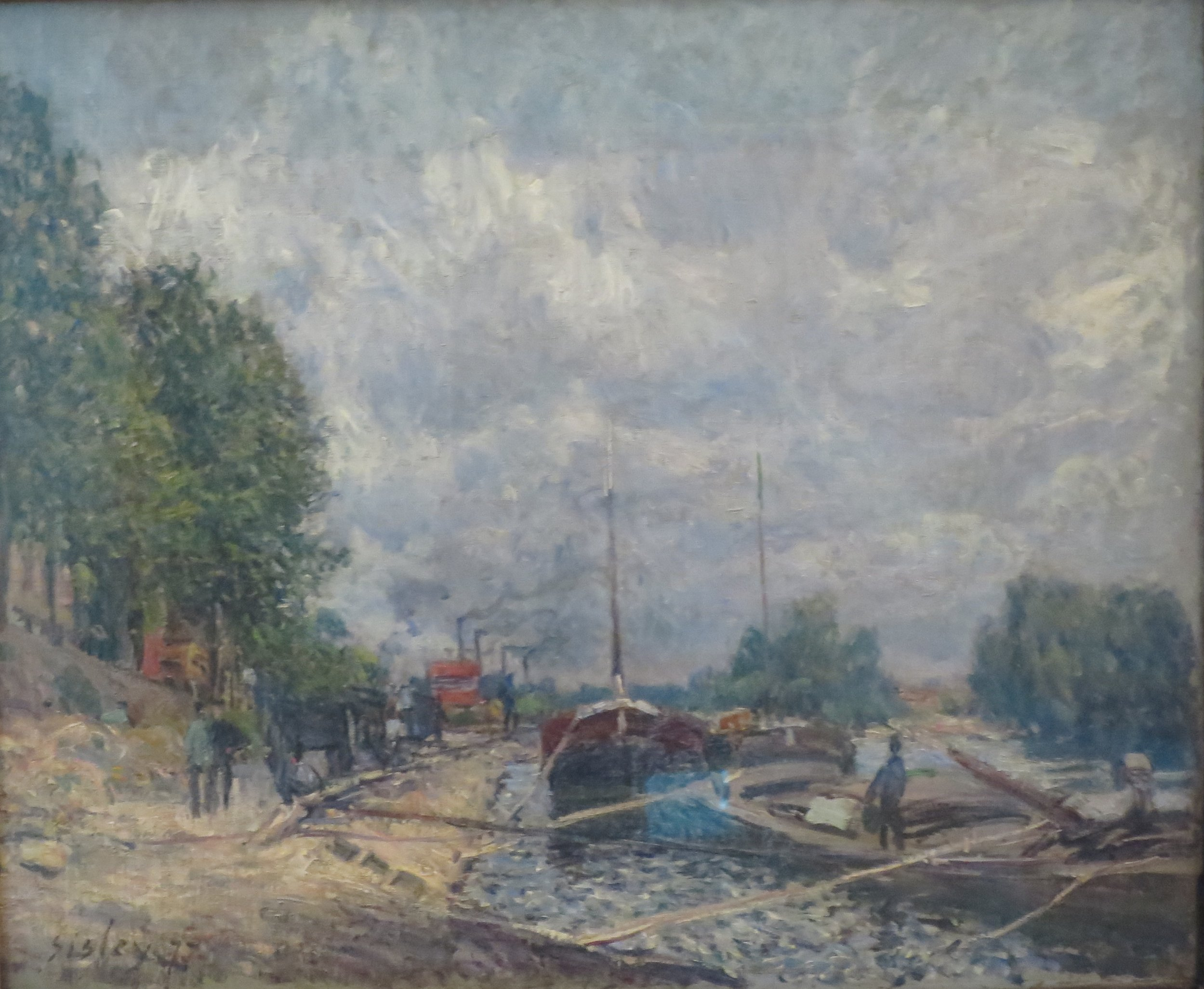
Sisley: The Barges at Billancourt (1877), Hermitage Museum

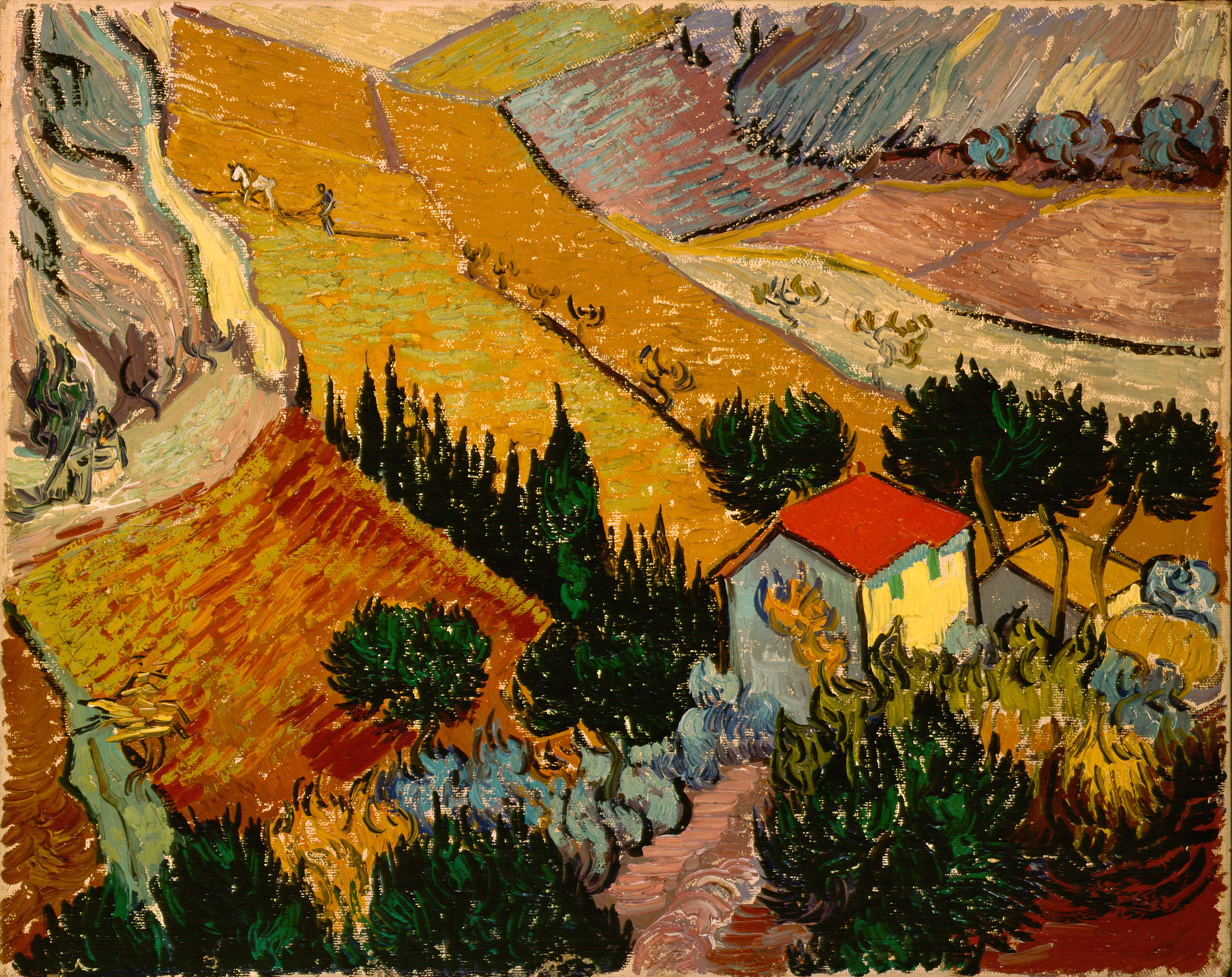
Van Gogh: Valley with Ploughman Seen from Above (1889), Hermitage Museum

Van Gogh: White House at Night (1890), Hermitage Museum

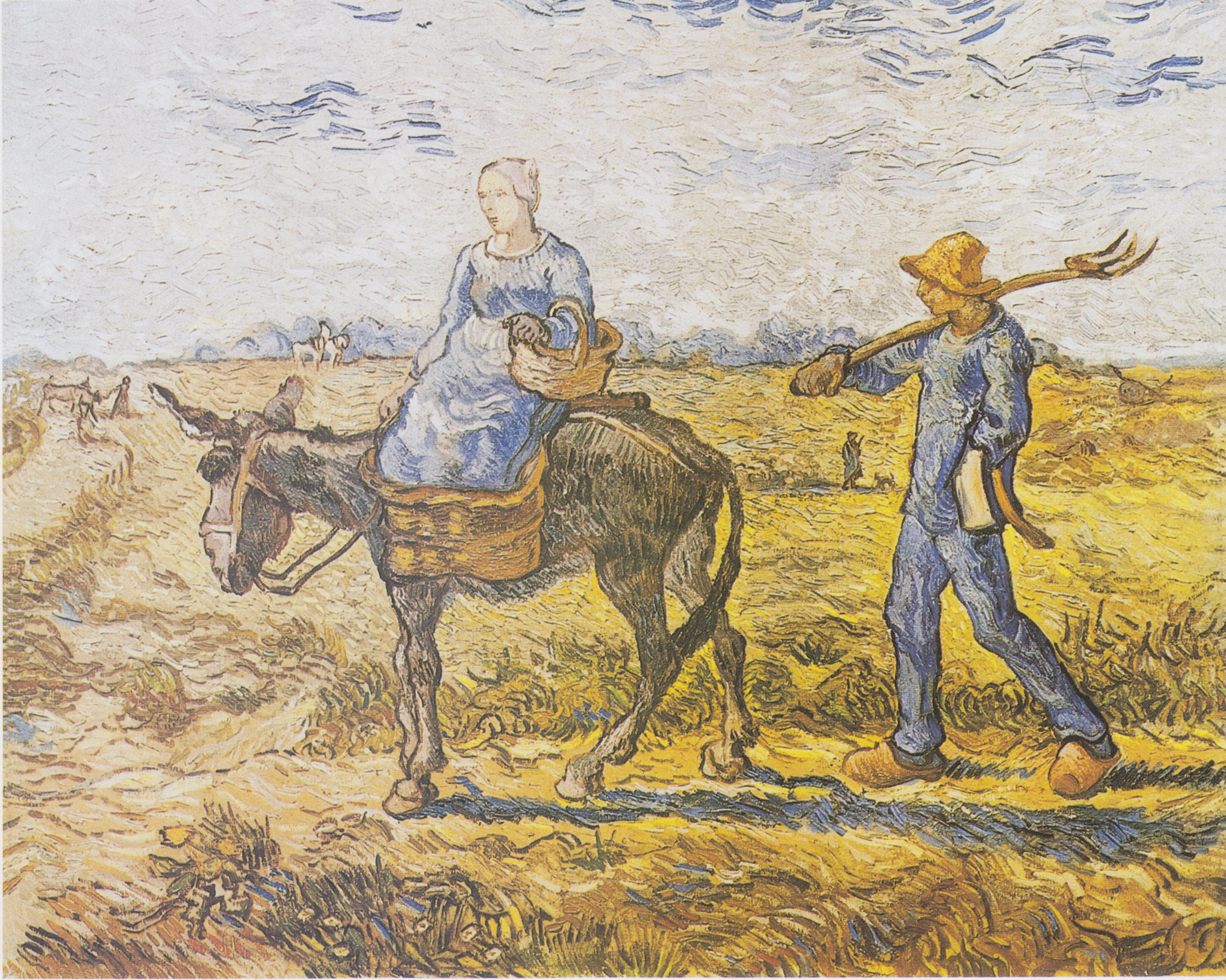
Van Gogh: Morning, Leaving for Work (1890), Hermitage Museum

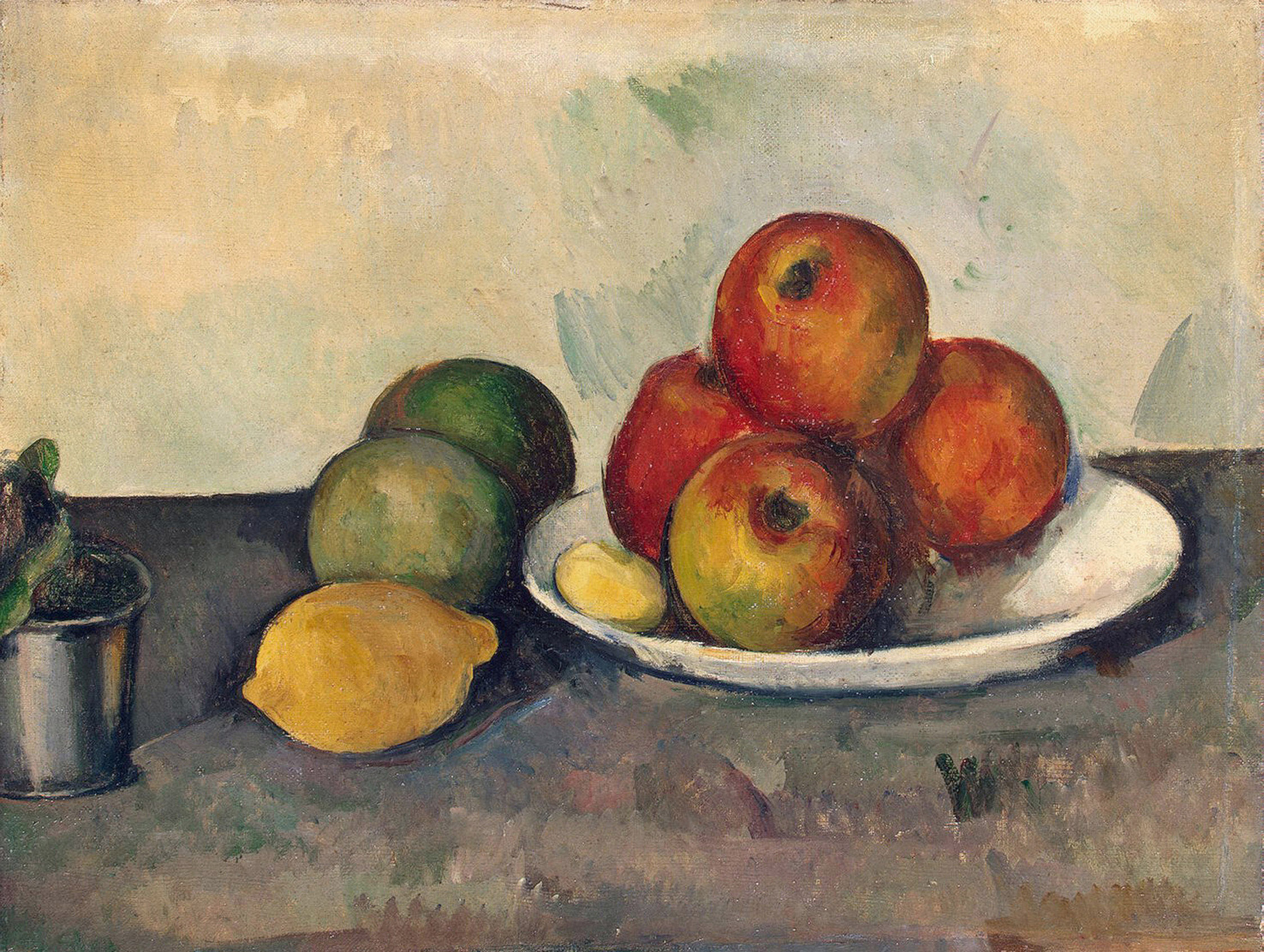
Cézanne: Still Life with Apples (vers 1890), Hermitage Museum

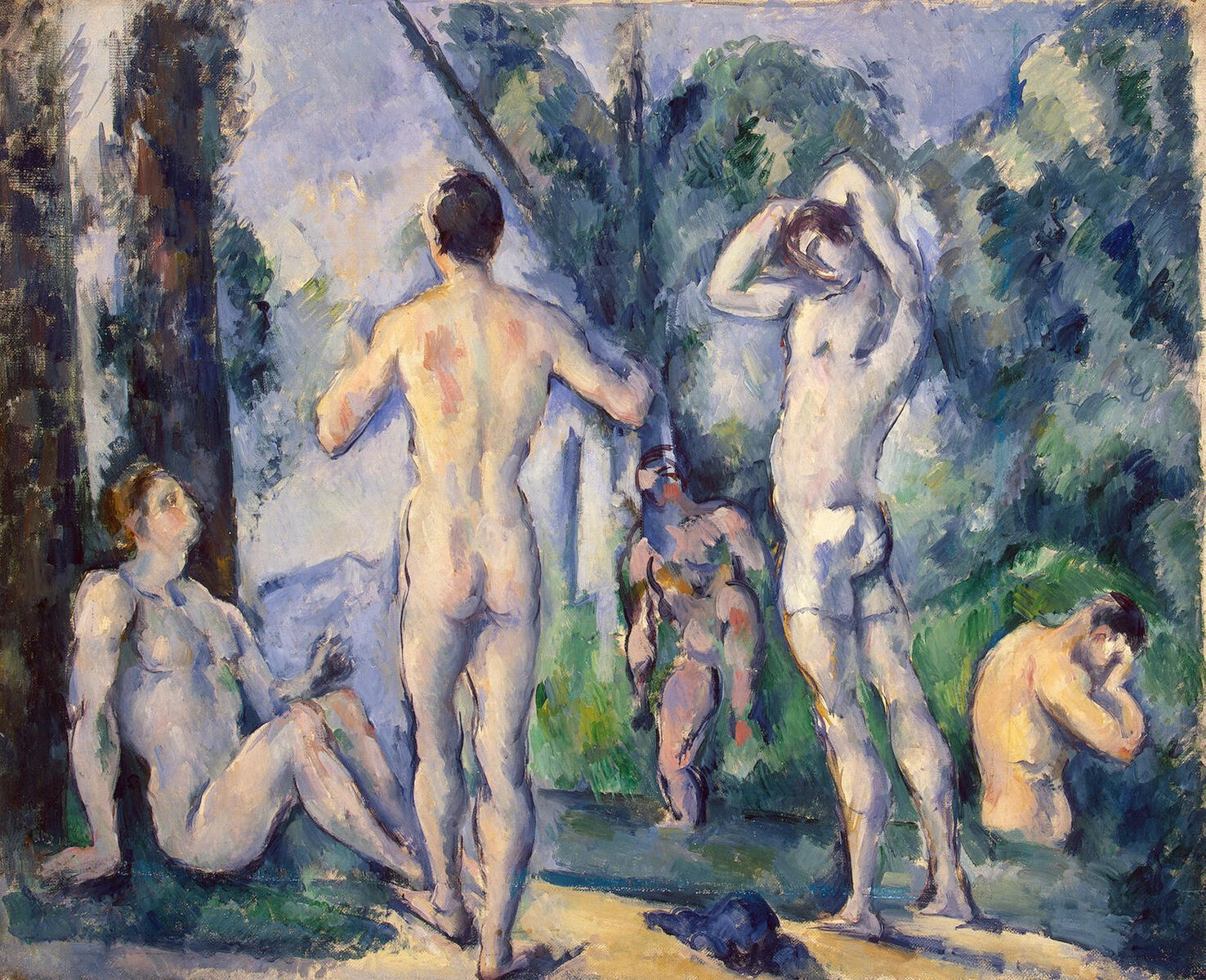
Cézanne: Bathers (1890 ou 1891), Hermitage Museum
