= The Seine at Asnières =

Painting by Claude Monet

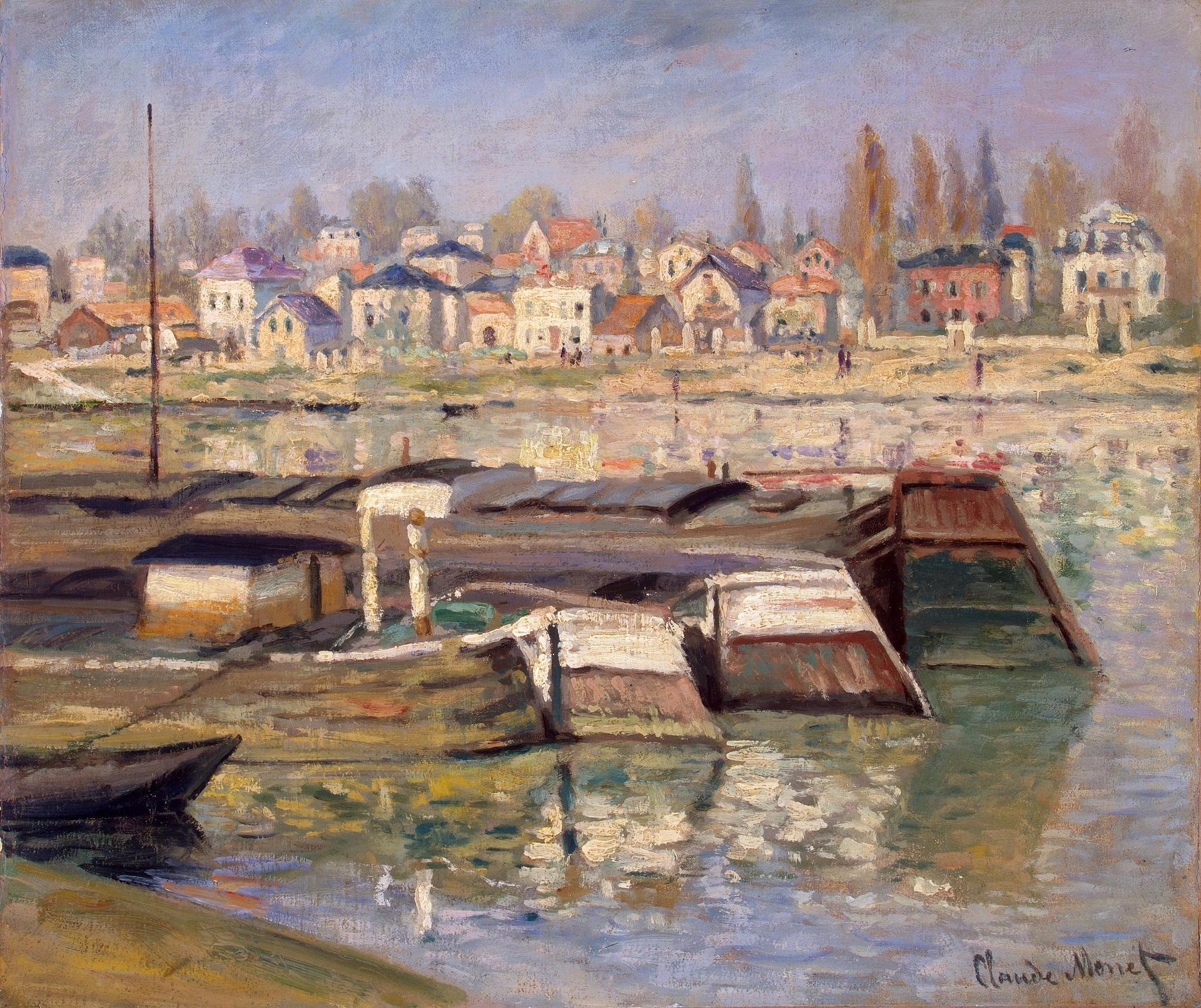
- Artist: Claude Monet
- Year: 1873
- Catalogue: W.269
- Medium: Oil on canvas
- Dimensions: 46.4 cm × 55.5 cm (18.3 in × 21.9 in)
- Location: Hermitage Museum; St. Petersburg

The Seine at Asnières is an 1873 oil on canvas painting by Claude Monet, now in the Hermitage Museum in St Petersburg. It was previously in the collection of Alice Meyer (née Sieveking; 1866–1949), widow of the extremely rich Hamburg businessman Eduard Lorenz Lorenz-Meyer (1856–1926) before being looted by the USSR after World War II and retained as war reparations. It has been on public display since an exhibition in 1995.

Painted a few months after producing Impression, Sunrise, it shows a late afternoon scene with péniches moored at Asnières on the Seine to the north-west of Paris. The small town had recently been linked by rail to Paris via gare Saint-Lazare and was starting to industrialise, with a population of workers and lower-middle-class inhabitants building themselves houses in gritstone or brick, some of which are shown with tree gardens on the opposite bank in the painting. Living at Argenteuil, another town on the Seine slightly to the north, Monet came to paint the subject with his friends.

== See also ==
- List of paintings by Claude Monet
