= Doctor Gachet's Garden in Auvers =

Painting by Vincent van Gogh

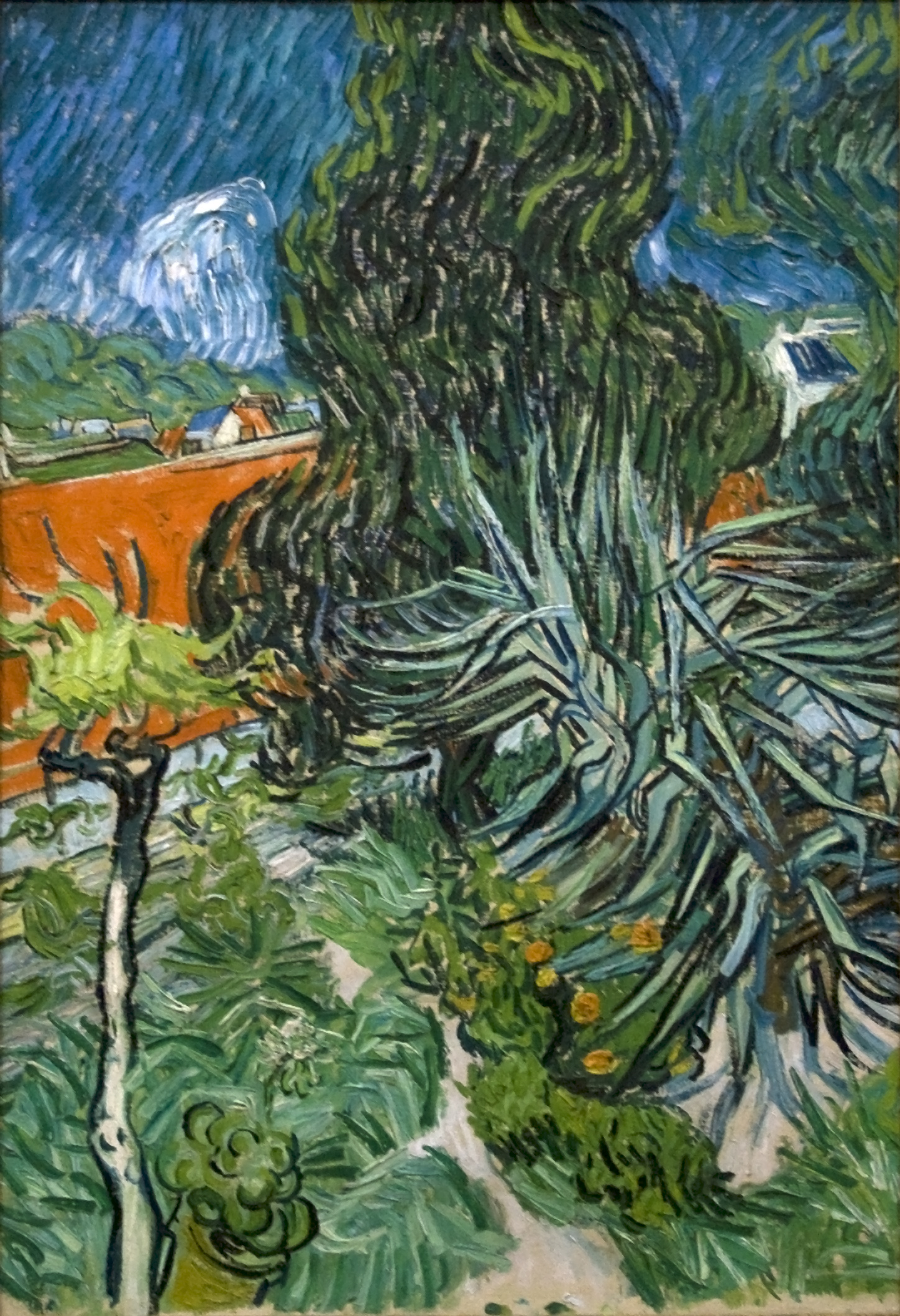
- Artist: Vincent van Gogh
- Year: 1890
- Medium: Oil on canvas
- Location: Musée d'Orsay, Paris (F755)

Marguerite Gachet in the Garden
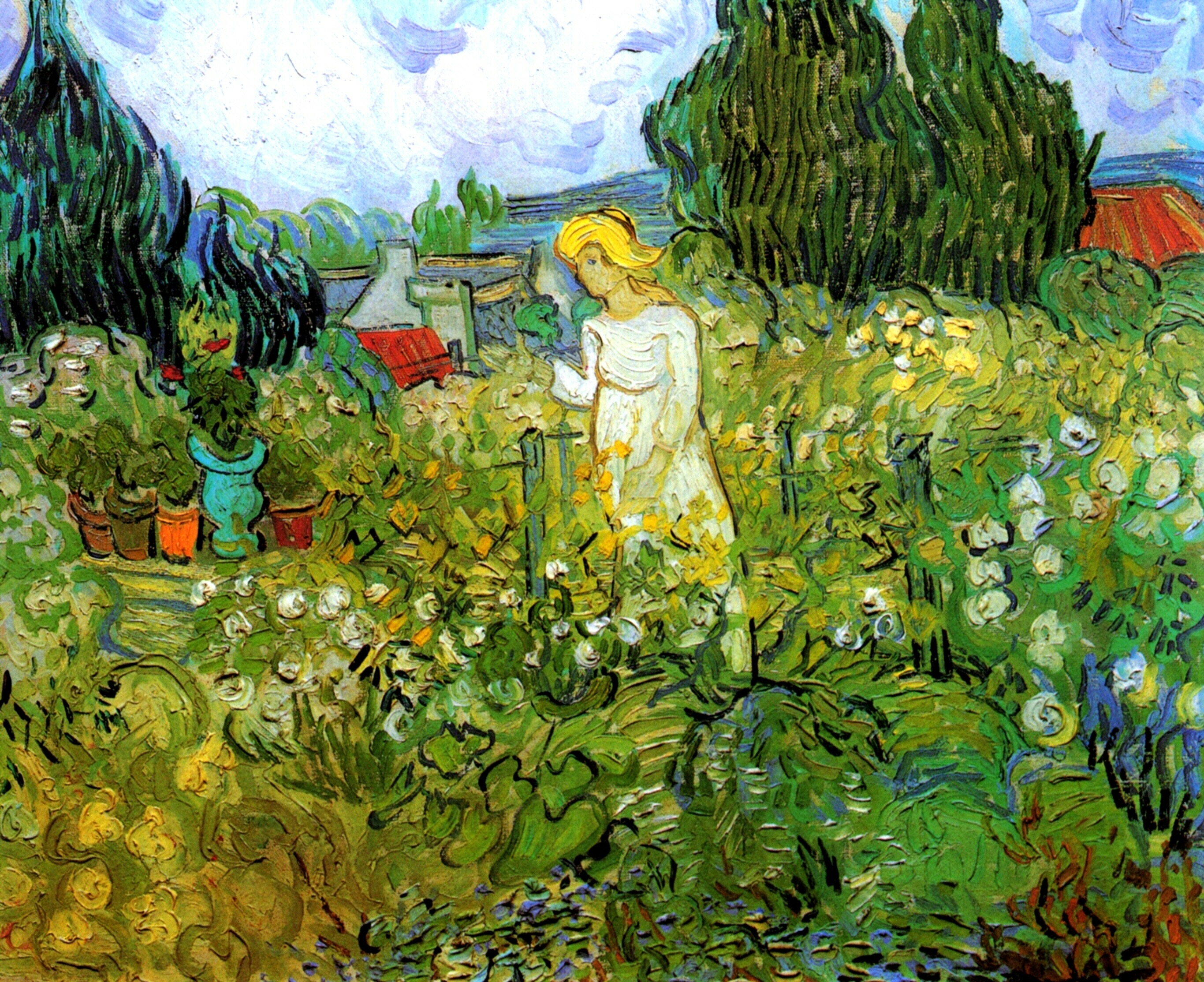
- Artist: Vincent van Gogh
- Year: 1890
- Medium: Oil on canvas
- Location: Musée d'Orsay, Paris (F756)

Dr. Gachet's Garden in Auvers and Marguerite Gachet in the Garden were both painted in 1890 by Vincent van Gogh in the gardens of his homeopathic physician, Paul Gachet. Both paintings reside at the Musée d'Orsay.

== Background ==
Following a year's stay at an asylum in Saint-Rémy, van Gogh left the hospital in May 1890 for Paris where he had a three-day stay with his brother, Theo, Theo's wife Johanna and their new baby Vincent. From there he went to Auvers-sur-Oise. Van Gogh left Saint-Rémy to come to Auvers to be near his brother, but away from the bustle of the city.

=== Dr. Gachet ===
While van Gogh was in Saint-Rémy, his brother, Theo and artist Camille Pissarro developed a plan for van Gogh to go to Auvers-sur-Oise with a letter of introduction for Paul Gachet a homeopathic physician and art patron who lived in Auvers. The plan also included him staying at a nearby inn while under the doctor's care. Van Gogh had a room at the nearby Auberge Ravoux.

Van Gogh developed a close relationship with the doctor who he described as "something like another brother." From the first meeting, though, van Gogh sensed that Dr. Gachet may have been as ill as he. In a letter from May 20, 1890, van Gogh wrote, "I have seen Dr. Gachet, who made the impression on me of being rather eccentric, but his experience as a doctor must keep him balanced while fighting the nervous trouble from which he certainly seems to me to be suffering at least as seriously as I."

=== Gardens ===
Van Gogh derived enjoyment from gardens; from his father's garden in the Netherlands, the garden he created at his London rental property when he was an art dealer there, to the many paintings that he made of flowers and other gardens. When he integrated Impressionism into his work, his interest in gardens are depicted in the gardens of the Arles hospital, Saint-Rémy asylum and the gardens of Charles Daubigny and Dr. Paul Gachet in Auvers.

Van Gogh wrote many letters to his brother Theo and his sister Willemina about gardening ideas, color harmonies and the benefits of working in a garden. Known for his works of sunflowers, he also made paintings with red poppies, grasses, irises and other garden plants. The colors used in the paintings may have been suggestive of his mood. When depressed, he painted "ghostly white-hooded arums." When he was in good mood he used bright colors, such as vibrant pink oleanders. During times of inner turmoil, “dark green spire like cypresses writhing with energy and contorted olive trees vibrant with silvery leaves.

To his sister, Wil, van Gogh advised her to cultivate her own garden, like Voltaire's Candide, to find joy and meaning in life.

== Paintings ==
Sue Roe, author of The Private Lives of the Impressionists, wrote of Dr. Gachet's garden:

"Dr. Gachet's house was set in the hillside above the main street [of the village], with a terraced garden full of flowers and looking down into the valley of the Oise. The house and garden were always full of stray cats, chickens and a ragged, featherless rooster... In the garden, he [Dr. Gachet] worked at a table painted bright orange (later immortalized by van Gogh, in his Portrait of Dr Gachet)."

"Maison du Dr. Gachet," the house and gardens of Dr. Paul Gachet, was opened to the public in 2004.

=== Doctor Gachet's Garden in Auvers ===
Van Gogh became friends with Gachet very quickly after arriving at Auvers. He was invited to visit his home as he wanted. Van Gogh hoped to paint Gachet's garden, possibly one or two days a week.

=== Marguerite Gachet in the Garden ===
In late June van Gogh wrote of his interest to paint Marguerite Gachet, maybe in a country girl pose. A few days later he wrote that he painted her in a pink dress playing a piano, and the previous day she had posed for this garden painting. In Marguerite Gachet in the Garden, Marguerite is dressed in white, "like a bride." The garden of white roses and light lemon marigolds. It was rumored in Auvers that van Gogh considered Marguerite a friend and that she desired a relationship with him.

Dr. Gachet, though, had not given permission for the sittings and when he learned of the two sittings in two consecutive nights he was quite apprehensive about any relationship they might share. Dr. Gachet asked van Gogh to end his relationship with Marguerite.

Derek Fell, author of Van Gogh's Women: Vincent's Love Affairs and Journey Into Madness, suggests that van Gogh may have cared more deeply than imagined and been at least in part the reason for shooting himself. In a letter to Theo van Gogh he expressed his sadness and frustration of not having a long-term partnership, "That desire [for marriage] has left me, though the mental suffering of it remains."

There were other concerns as well that affected van Gogh at that time: the illness of Theo's baby, Theo's health and employment issues, potential loss of Theo's support and the destruction of his relationship with Dr. Gachet who was meant to manage van Gogh's health and be a stabilizing influence.

=== Provenance ===
Both 'garden paintings' were part of the collection of Dr. Gachet until 1954 when they were given to the state and allotted to the Louvre museum, gallery of Jeu de Paume. The paintings resided there at the gallery of Jeu de Paume, or Musée de l'Impressionisme from 1954 to 1986. In 1986 the museum closed due to cramped conditions and its collections were transferred to the new Musée d’Orsay. Since 1986 the paintings have been at the Musée d'Orsay.

== Other paintings of the Gachets ==
Gachet and his daughter were both subjects for van Gogh's paintings.

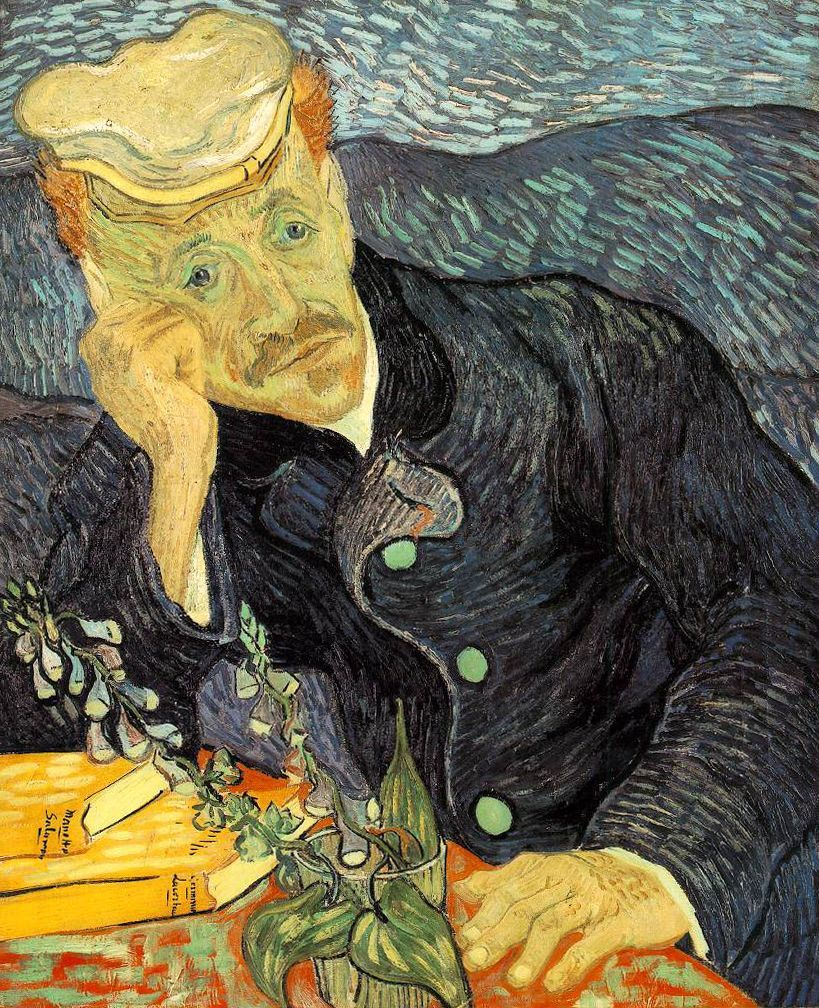
Portrait of Dr. Gachet
(1st version)
1890
Private Collection (F753)

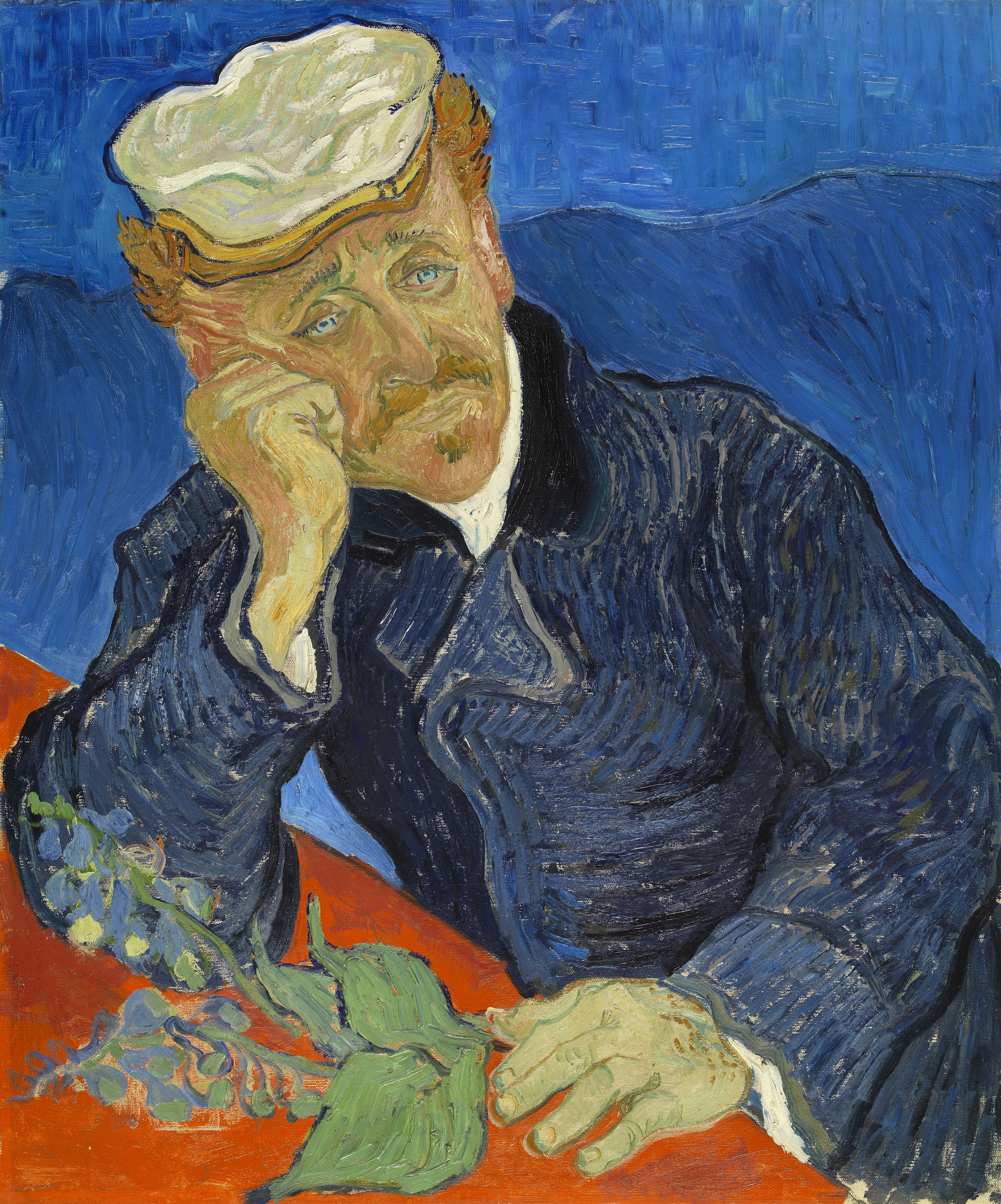
Portrait of Dr. Gachet
(2nd version)
1890
Musée d'Orsay, Paris (F754)

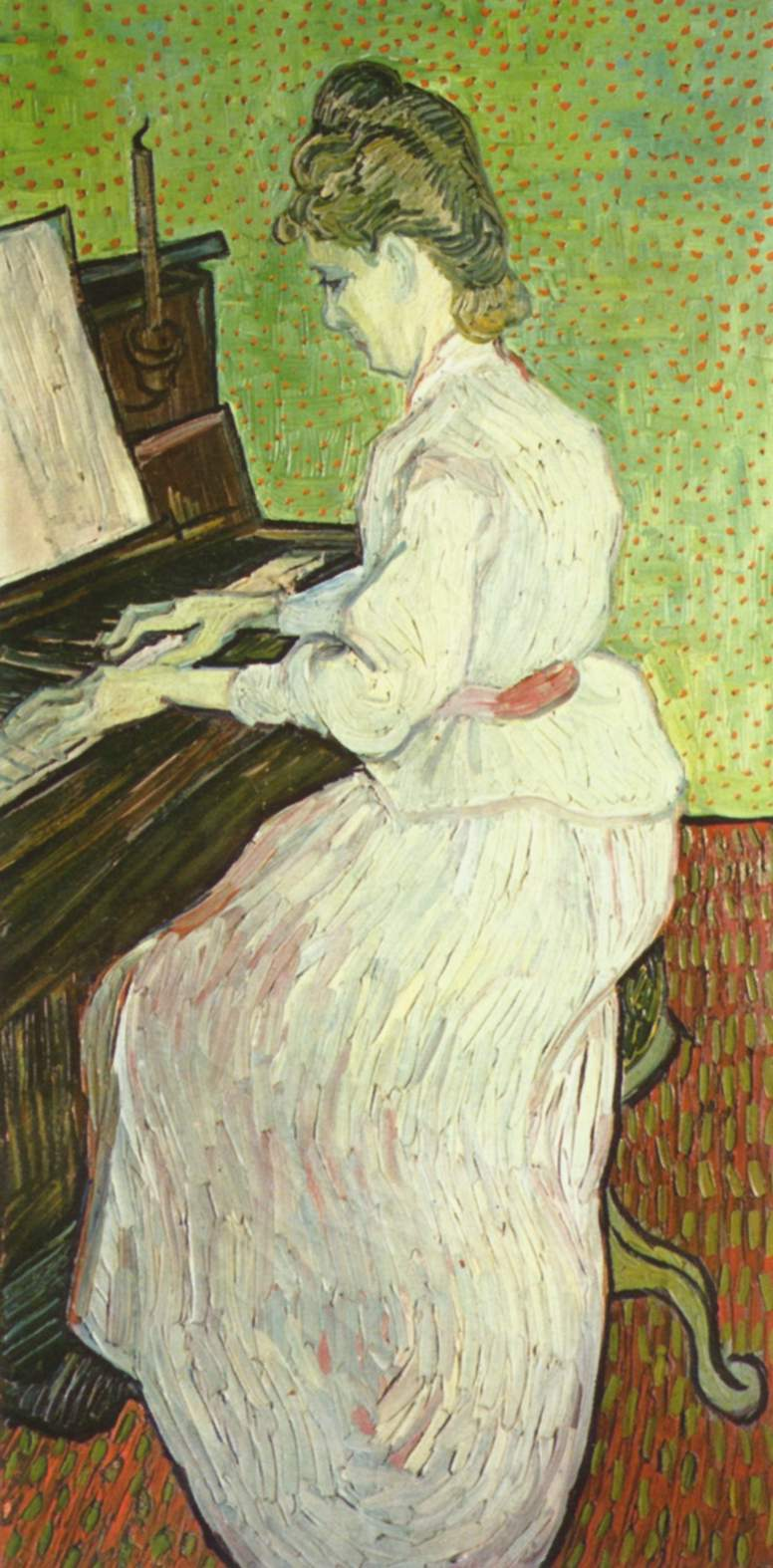
Marguerite Gachet at the Piano
1890
Kunstmuseum Basel, Basel, Switzerland (F772)

== Vincent van Gogh's last months ==
For a time, Van Gogh seemed to improve. He began to paint at such a steady pace, there was barely space in his room for all the finished paintings. From May until his death on July 29, Van Gogh made about 70 paintings, more than one a day, and many drawings. Van Gogh painted buildings around the town of Auvers, such as The Church at Auvers, portraits, and the nearby fields.

From Wallace, "But for all his appearance of a renewed well-being his life was very near its end." Illness struck Theo's baby, Vincent. Theo had both health and employment issues; he considered leaving his employer and starting his own business. Gachet, said to have his own eccentricities and neurosis, caused Van Gogh concern to which he questioned: "Now when one blind man leads another blind man, don't they both end up in the ditch?"

After visiting Paris for a family conference, Van Gogh returned to Auvers more bleak. In a letter he wrote, "And the prospect grows darker, I see no future at all."

== See also ==
- List of works by Vincent van Gogh
