= Kramarsky =

Kramarsky is a surname. Notable people with the surname include:

- Lola Kramarsky (1896–1991), German-born American zionist advocate
- Siegfried Kramarsky (1893–1961), German-born American banker, philanthropist, and art collector
- Werner H. Kramarsky (1926–2019), Dutch-born American public official and art collector
