= Wolfgang Flöttl =

Austrian investment banker

Wolfgang Flöttl (born 1955 in Vienna) is an Austrian investment banker. After receiving a J.D. from Vienna University in 1978, he studied for an MBA from Harvard Business School in 1981 as well as from the London School of Economics.

He joined Kidder, Peabody & Co., where he advanced to vice president. In 1987, Flöttl formed an investment fund along with BAWAG, an Austrian bank which was a major investor in the fund. After ten years of substantial returns the fund suffered heavy losses when the dollar lost over 15% in value against the yen in a matter of days. In 2006, the management of the bank was charged with breach of trust and Flöttl with assistance of breach of trust. On 4 July 2008 he was convicted of assistance of breach of trust. He appealed the court's decision.

In December 2010, the Supreme Court of Austria set the conviction aside. The prosecution decided to retry the case with a new trial. On 18 December 2012, he was acquitted of all charges. On 15 May 2013, with the prosecution’s decision not to appeal, the full acquittal became final and legally binding.

In 2007, it became publicly known that Flöttl had purchased Van Gogh's Portrait of Dr. Gachet in 1997 or 1998 from Ryoei Saito. Later, he had to sell the painting to a private collector who remains anonymous to date.
