= Werner H. Kramarsky =

Dutch-born American public official and art collector

- Born: Werner Hans Kramarsky; March 5, 1926; Amsterdam, The Netherlands
- Died: August 22, 2019 (aged 93); Manhattan, New York City, U.S.
- Occupation(s): Public official, art collector
- Spouse: Sarah-Ann Backer (m. 1959)
- Children: 2 sons, 2 daughters
- Parent(s): Siegfried Kramarsky; Lola Kramarsky
- Relatives: Dorothy Schiff (mother-in-law)

Werner Hans Kramarsky (March 5, 1926 – August 22, 2019) was a Dutch-born American public official and art collector. His collection included works by Mel Bochner, Eva Hesse, Ellsworth Kelly, Sol LeWitt, Brice Marden, Agnes Martin, Richard Serra. He donated some of it to the Museum of Modern Art. He donated about 300 works on paper, to Harvard’s collection of contemporary art

His papers are in the archives of the MoMa where he was a trustee and a donor.
