= Siegfried Kramarsky =

- Born: April 14, 1893; Lübeck, Germany
- Died: December 25, 1961 (aged 68); Manhattan, New York, United States
- Occupation: Banker
- Spouse: Violet Popper (m. 1921)
- Children: Sonja Kramarsky Binkhorst; Werner H. Kramarsky; Bernard Kramarsky

Siegfried Kramarsky (April 14, 1893 – December 25, 1961) was a German American banker, philanthropist, and art collector of Jewish descent.

== Life ==
He was the director of the Amsterdam branch of the banking firm Lisser & Rosenkranz, headquartered in Hamburg, from 1923 until 1938. In light of the rise of Nazism in neighboring Germany, Kramarsky emigrated to Canada, and later New York City.

While in Amsterdam, Kramarsky compiled a large art collection that included several paintings of Vincent van Gogh. Shortly before the German invasion of the Netherlands, he bought Daubigny's Garden and the Portrait of Dr. Gachet from Franz Koenigs. In 1990, the latter was sold by Kramarsky's heirs to Ryoei Saito for $82.5 million, making it one of the most expensive paintings in the world.

== Art collections from Kramarsky ==
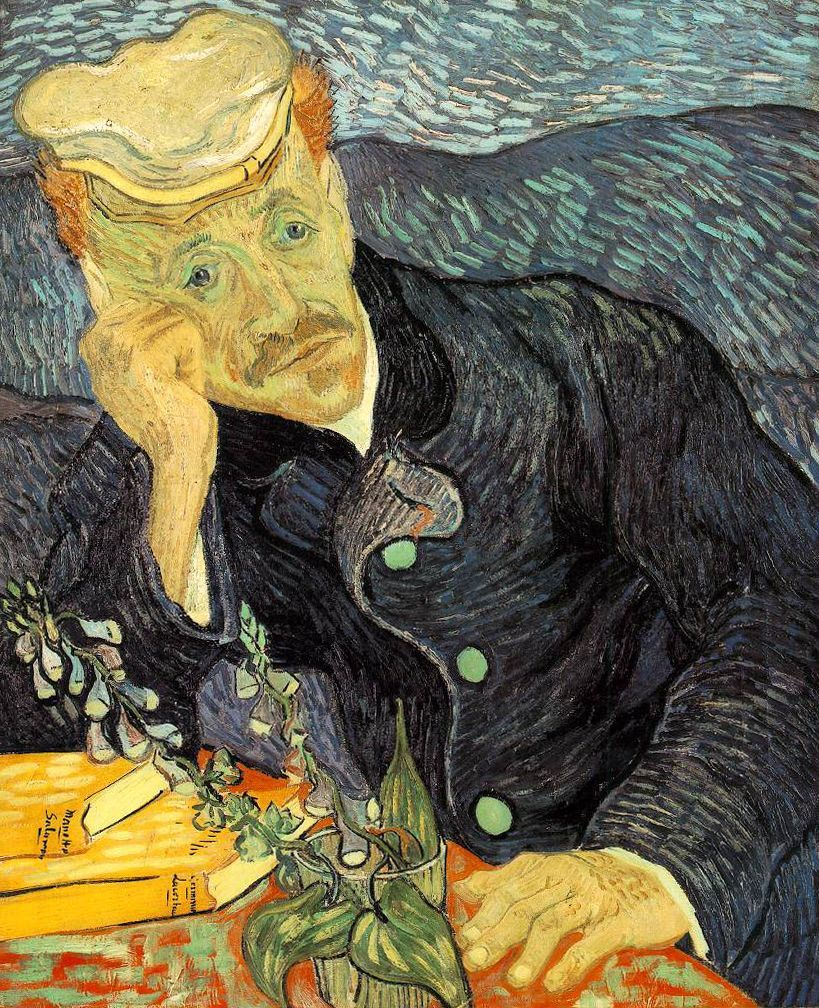
Vincent van Gogh:
Porträt des Dr. Gachet
1890, private collection

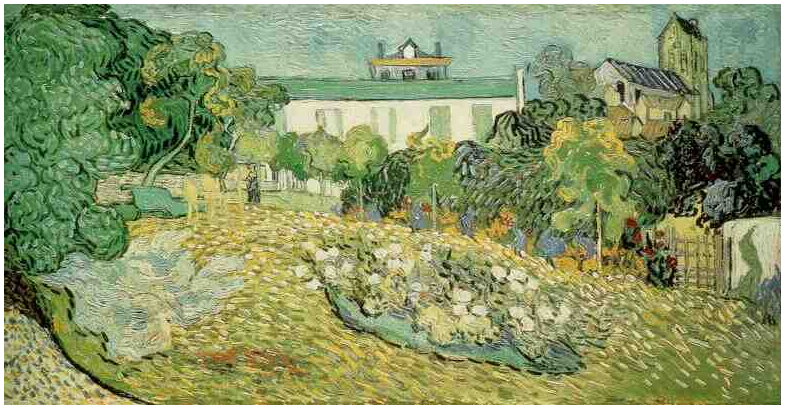
Vincent van Gogh:
Der Garten Daubignys
1890, Hiroshima Museum of Art

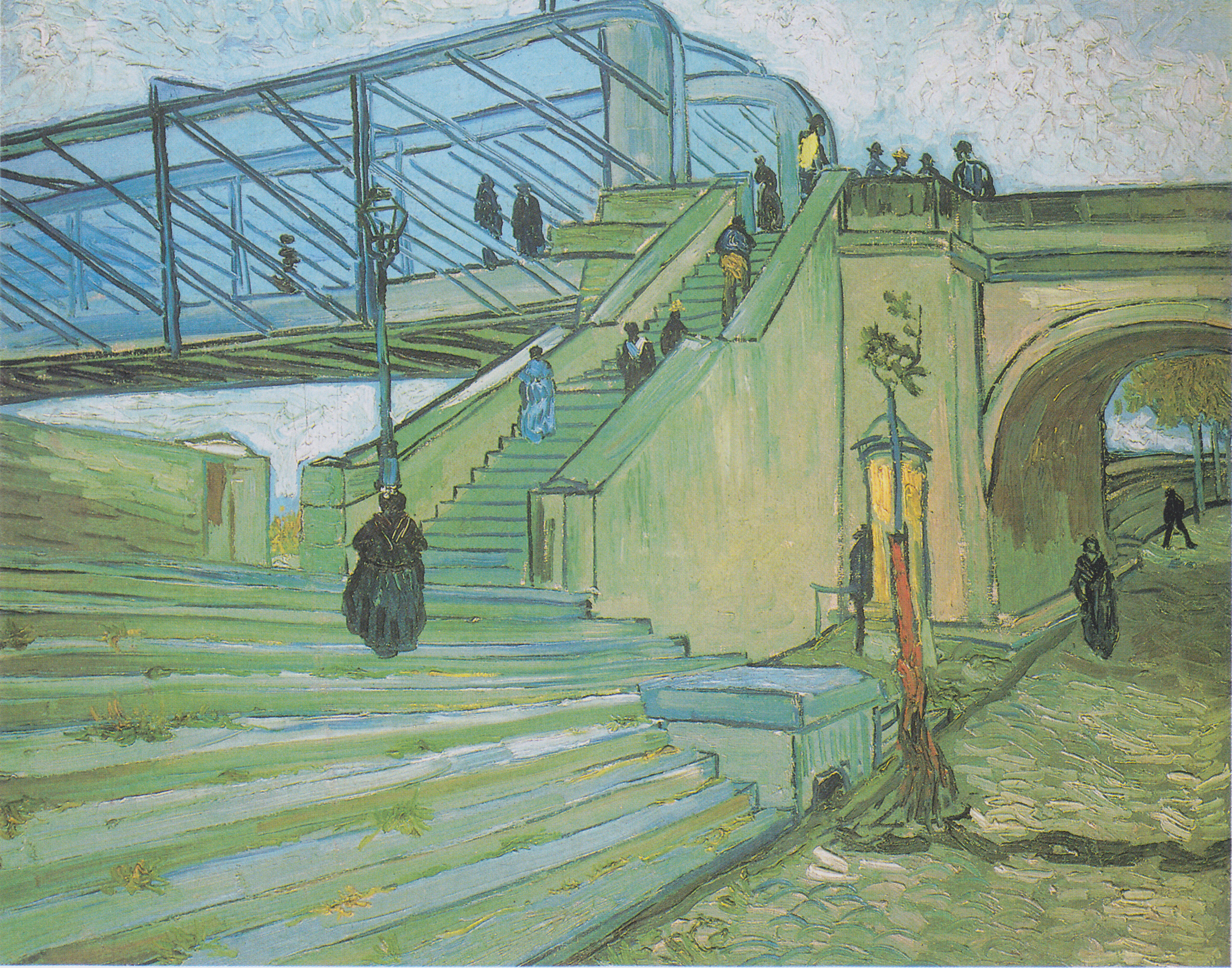
Vincent van Gogh:
Die Brücke von Trinquetaille
1888, Privatsammlung, Leihgabe im Kunsthaus Zürich

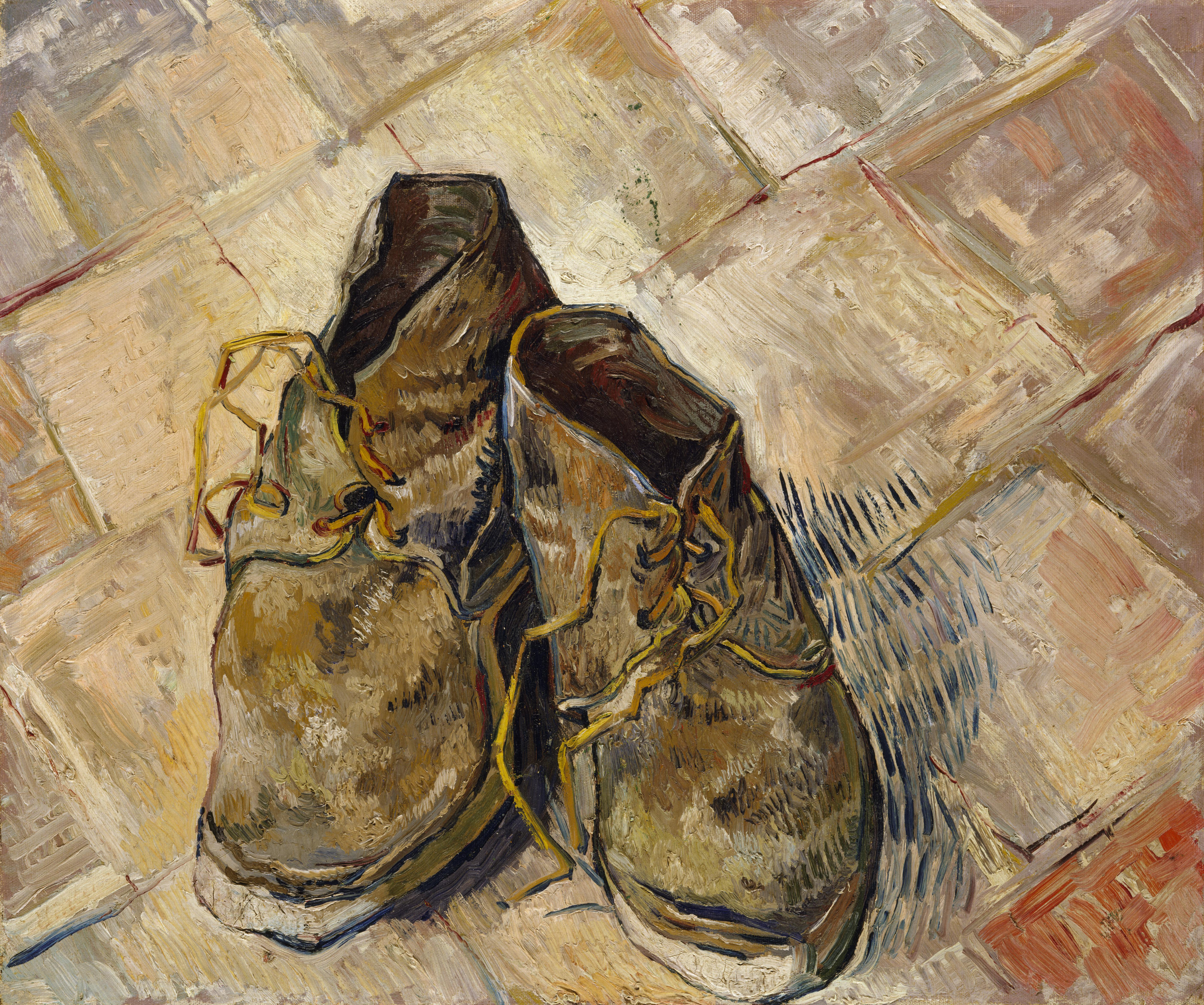
Vincent van Gogh:
Schuhe
1888, Metropolitan Museum of Art
