= Ryoei Saito =

Japanese businessman and art collector

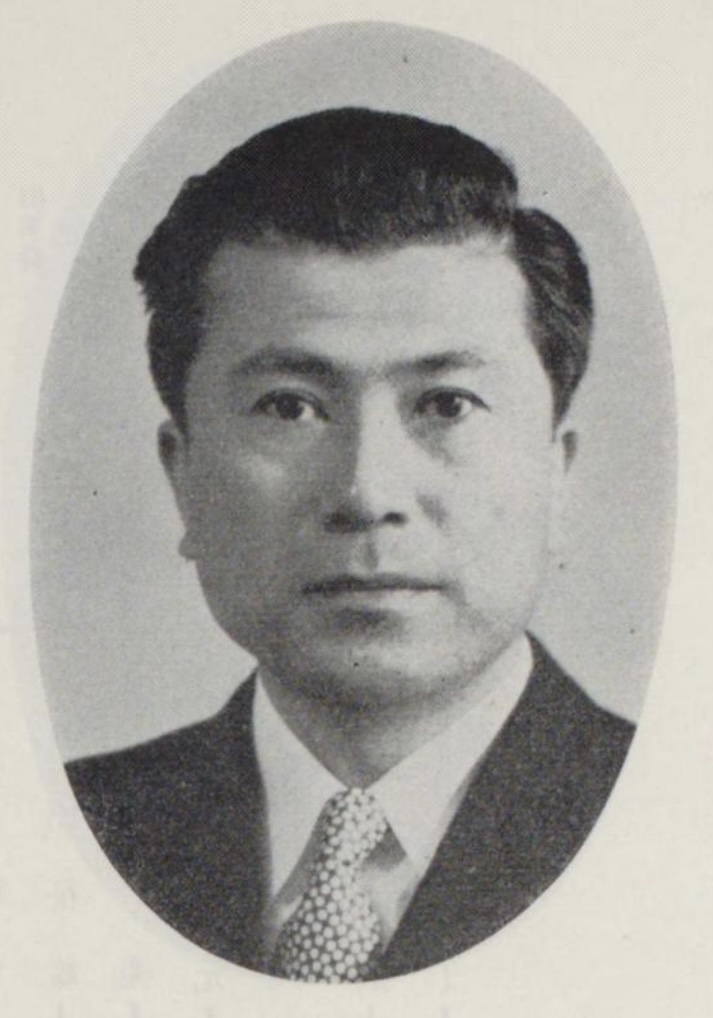
Ryoei Saito

Ryoei Saito (齊藤 了英, Saitō Ryōei; April 17, 1916 – March 30, 1996) was the honorary chairman of Daishowa Paper Manufacturing in Japan.

He was noted for his purchase of expensive art. Specifically, at consecutive auctions by Christie's and Sotheby's in New York in mid May 1990, Saito bought Van Gogh's Portrait of Dr. Gachet and a second, smaller version of Renoir's Bal du moulin de la Galette for $82.5 and $78.1 million, respectively. At the time, these were the two most expensive paintings sold, either at auction or through private sales. Taking inflation in account, they remained the two most expensive paintings until the private sale of Klimt's Portrait of Adele Bloch-Bauer I in June 2006. It took 25 years before Saito's public auction price was broken, through the sale of Picasso's Les Femmes d'Alger ("Version O") at Christie's, New York, in May 2015.

Saito died of a stroke six years after his acquisitions. Three years later, the Metropolitan Museum of Art in New York, after failing to locate the Van Gogh for an exhibition, expressed concern that both paintings may have been cremated with the owner, since Saito had mentioned in the early 1990s, after having to pay $24 million in taxes for them, that it would be better to do so, in order to avoid colossal death duties for his children. Only in 2007 did it became publicly known that the painting had been sold in 1997 or 1998 to the Austrian-born investment fund manager Wolfgang Flöttl.
