= Marguerite Gachet =

Model for Vincent van Gogh

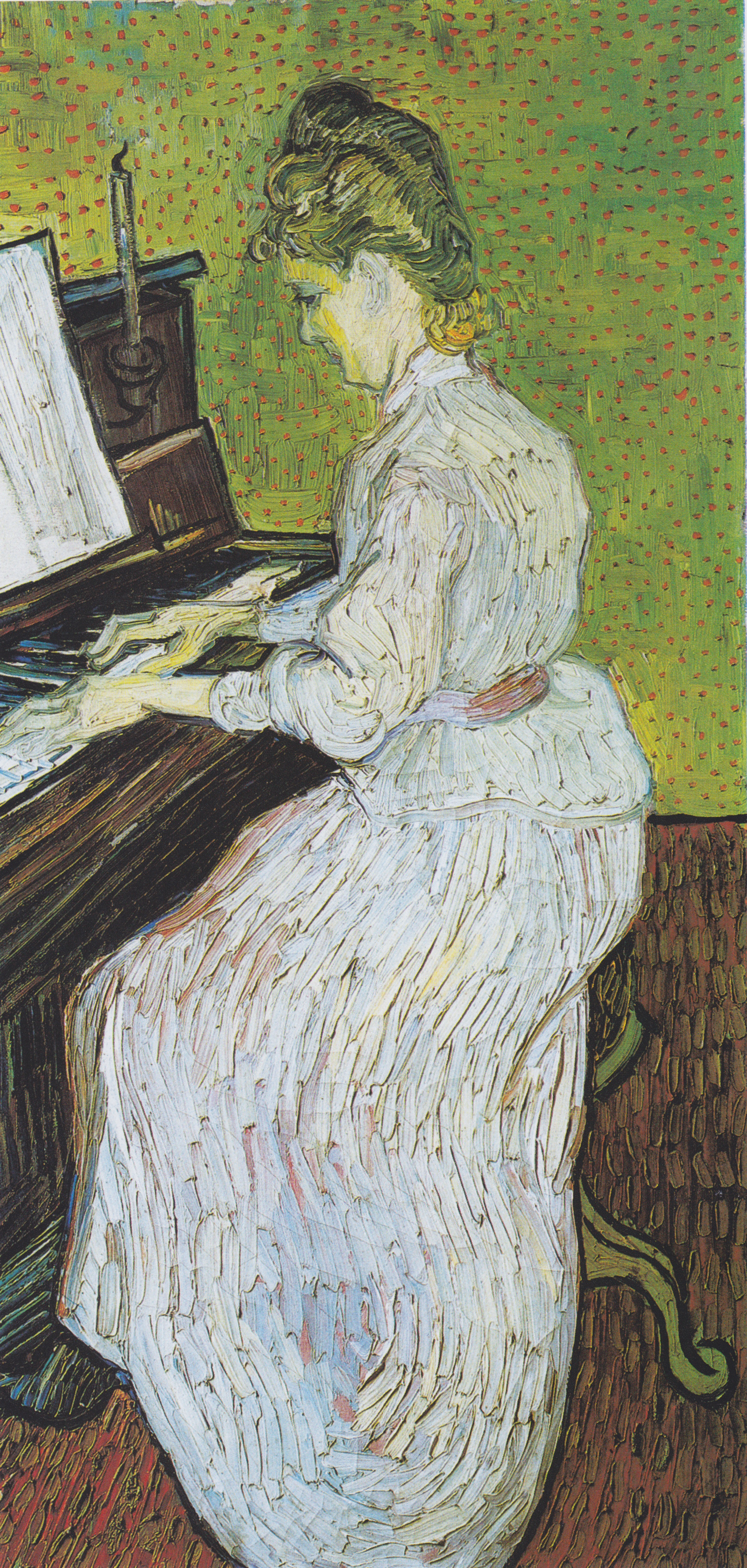
- Born: Margueritte Clémentine Elisa Gachet; 21 June 1869
- Died: 8 November 1949 (aged 80)

Marguerite Gachet (21 June 1869 – 8 November 1949) was a French woman who was painted by Vincent van Gogh in two paintings.

== Life ==
Gachet was born in 1869 to Paul Gachet and his wife. Her younger brother was born at the family's new home in Auvers-sur-Oise. She met Van Gogh when she was nineteen. He painted her in the family garden on 1 June 1890. He came to stay with her father, Paul Gachet for several weeks towards the end of his life. Her father was a doctor, an amateur artist and a friend of leading impressionist painters. Paul Cézanne had helped her father create an attic studio. The date of Van Gogh's painting of her is certain as one of Van Gogh's frequent letters to his brother, Theo, details the painting. Vincent describes the cypresses and flowers in Dr Gachet's garden and the "white figure" he included.

For some weeks, Van Gogh proposed that would he make a painting of her. He made two sketches of Gachet at the piano, and again he wrote to his brother on 26/27 June to tell him that he had started the painting. Van Gogh commented to his brother that he thought that Theo's wife, Jo, would get on well with Marguerite.

The paintings appeared in catalogues in 1928, but they were owned privately.

Van Gogh gave both of the paintings to Gachet's father who kept them. The paintings were first exhibited after they were donated by Paul Gachet to the Musée d'Orsay in Paris in 1954.

Gachet never married and died in 1949. She was buried in the Père Lachaise Cemetery. The pictures of her, along with many other valuable family paintings, were given to a museum.

== In popular works ==
In the 2017 film Loving Vincent, Gachet is played by Saoirse Ronan. The film depicts Gachet as an object of Van Gogh's affection who withdrew from any relationship, even a friendly one, at the request of her father to allow the genius to create masterpieces. In the film, she also places flowers on Van Gogh's grave daily.
