= Paul Gachet =

French physician who treated the painter Vincent van Gogh during his last weeks

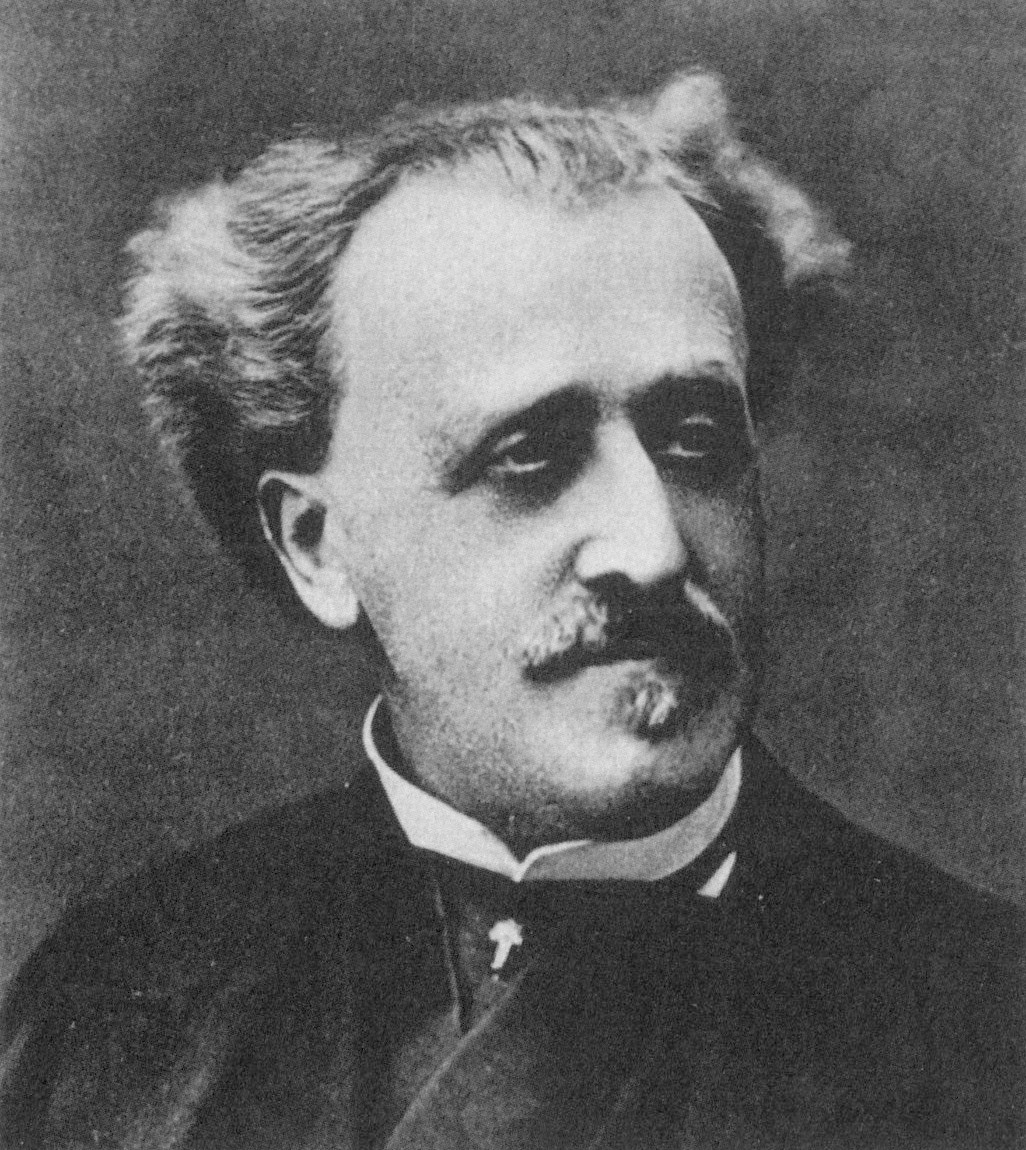
- Born: 30 July 1828; Lille, France
- Died: 9 January 1909 (aged 80)
- Resting place: Père Lachaise Cemetery, Paris
- Education: University of Paris
- Occupation: Physician
- Children: Marguerite Gachet (1869–1949), Paul Gachet Jr (1873–1962)

Paul-Ferdinand Gachet (French: [pɔl ɡaʃɛ]; 30 July 1828 – 9 January 1909) was a French physician most famous for treating the painter Vincent van Gogh during his last weeks in Auvers-sur-Oise. Gachet was a great supporter of artists and the Impressionist movement. He was an amateur painter, signing his works "Paul van Ryssel", referring to his birthplace: Rijsel is the Dutch name of Lille.

== Biography ==
He was born and raised in Lille. His family moved to Mechelen, whence Gachet's father was transferred in 1844/1845 to start a new branch of the firm he was working for.

While a student at the University of Paris, he learned drawing in his spare time, and collected paintings by Gustave Courbet and Édouard Manet. After gaining his BA degree, he worked at the mental hospitals of Bicêtre and Salpêtrière. His teachers included Armand Trousseau. In 1858 he received a medical degree for his thesis Étude sur la Mélancolie.

He returned to Paris and set up a private homeopathic practice. Gachet married Blanche Castets in 1868. Their daughter, Marguerite Clémentine Elisa was born in 1869. In 1872 he bought a house in Auvers-sur-Oise, a village around 27 kilometres (17 mi) from Paris that was popular with artists. There he welcomed artists such as Camille Pissarro, Armand Guillaumin, Victor Vignon, and Paul Cézanne, Cézanne helping him establish his own studio in his attic.

Gachet also knew Gustave Courbet, Champfleury and Victor Hugo. He was a friend of the chemist Henri Nestlé and prescribed Nestlé's new powdered milk supplement to some of his child patients. Under the pen-name Blanche de Mézin, he published articles as an art critic.

He spent much time with Charles Méryon after the etcher's committal to Charenton. He oversaw Auguste Renoir's recovery from pneumonia in 1882. He advised Édouard Manet against the amputation of his leg. However, Manet did not follow this advice.

Gachet's tomb is situated in section 52 of Père Lachaise Cemetery in Paris.

== Gachet and Vincent van Gogh ==
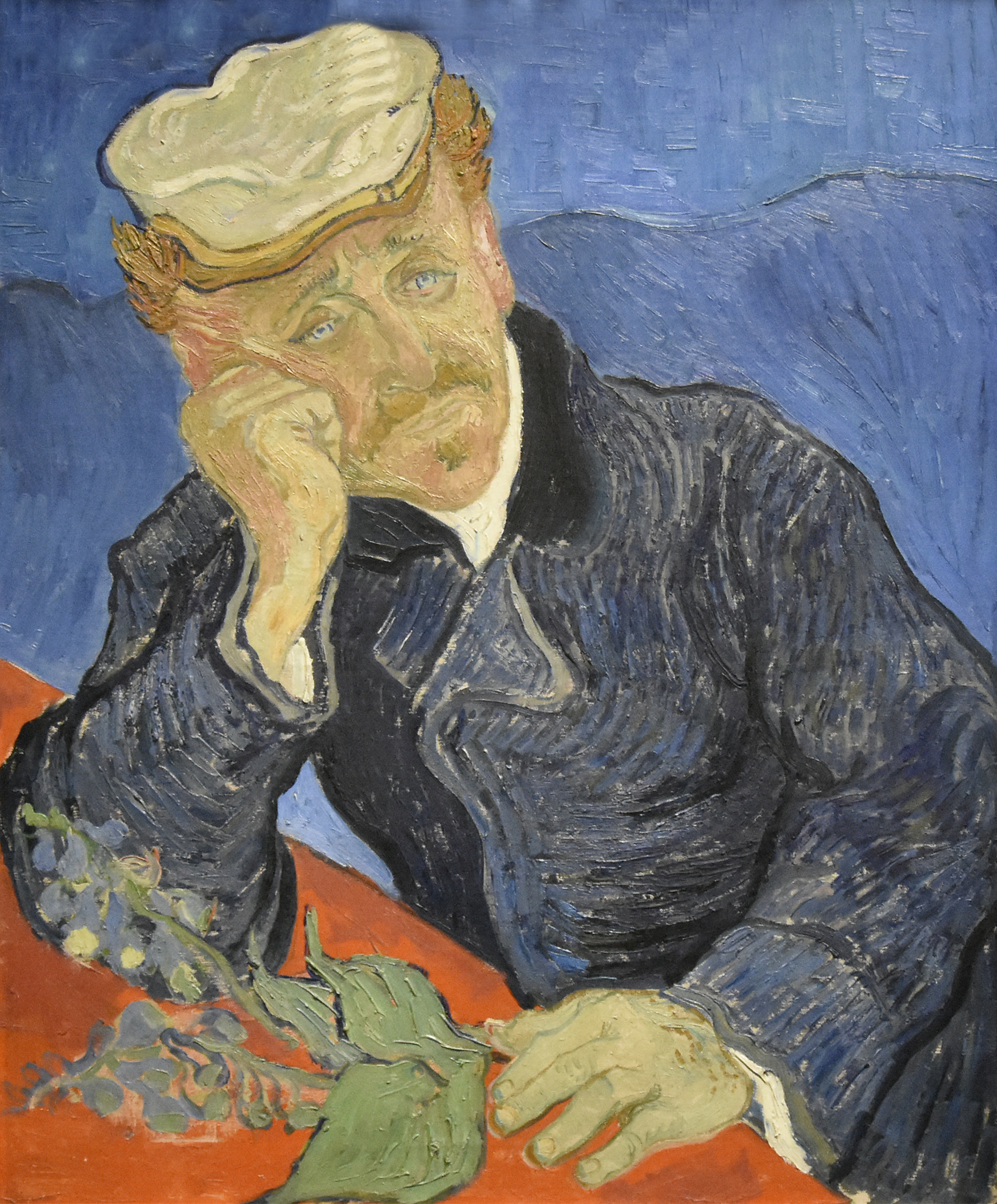
Paul Gachet, painting by Vincent van Gogh (1890), second version (see below)

Vincent van Gogh suffered from a mental disorder and committed himself to an asylum on 8 May 1889. He was released from the asylum on 16 May 1890, but continuation of medical attention was required, which included Van Gogh being under supervision. Vincent's brother, Theo van Gogh, thought that Gachet's background and sensitivity toward artists would make him an ideal doctor for Vincent during his recovery. Very soon after he began seeing Gachet, however, Vincent began to doubt the doctor's usefulness. Vincent described Gachet as: "sicker than I am, I think, or shall we say just as much". However, after a while of meeting up with Gachet, Van Gogh's opinion of him improved. Van Gogh found a friend in him; he mentions that he was not only a muse but also a caretaker. Vincent wrote of the doctor, 'I have found in him a complete friend, even something like a new brother, ... '.

Gachet has been the subject of criticism over the years regarding Van Gogh's suicide. According to van Gogh biographer Wilfred Arnold, "there was not much else available to any physician of the day which could have reversed the course of Vincent's illness," and he summarizes the medical treatment that Van Gogh received from his various doctors thus: "The overall assessment is rather that they did as well as expected with an unfamiliar disease and a difficult patient."

== Subject in art ==
Gachet was friends with and treated Pissarro, Renoir, Manet, Cézanne and Goeneutte, to name just a few. He had amassed a substantial impressionist art collection before he died in 1909. Gachet, his wife and his home were the subjects of several pieces of art by celebrated artists.

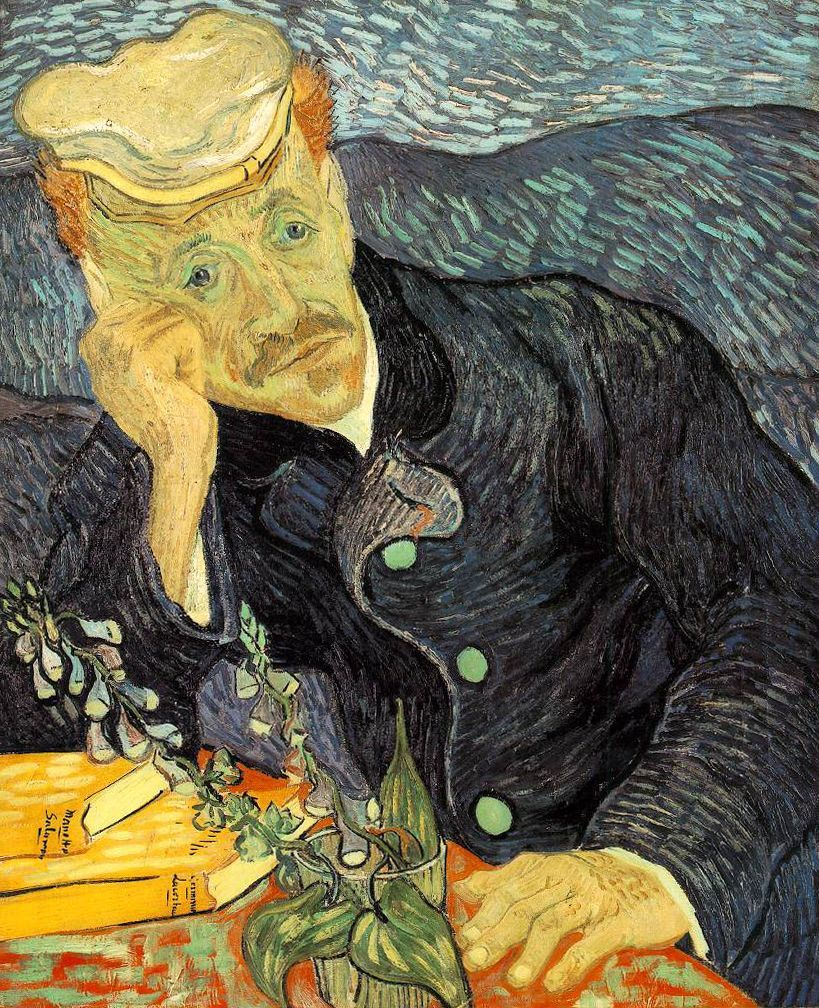
Portrait of Dr. Gachet, painting by Vincent van Gogh (1890), first version

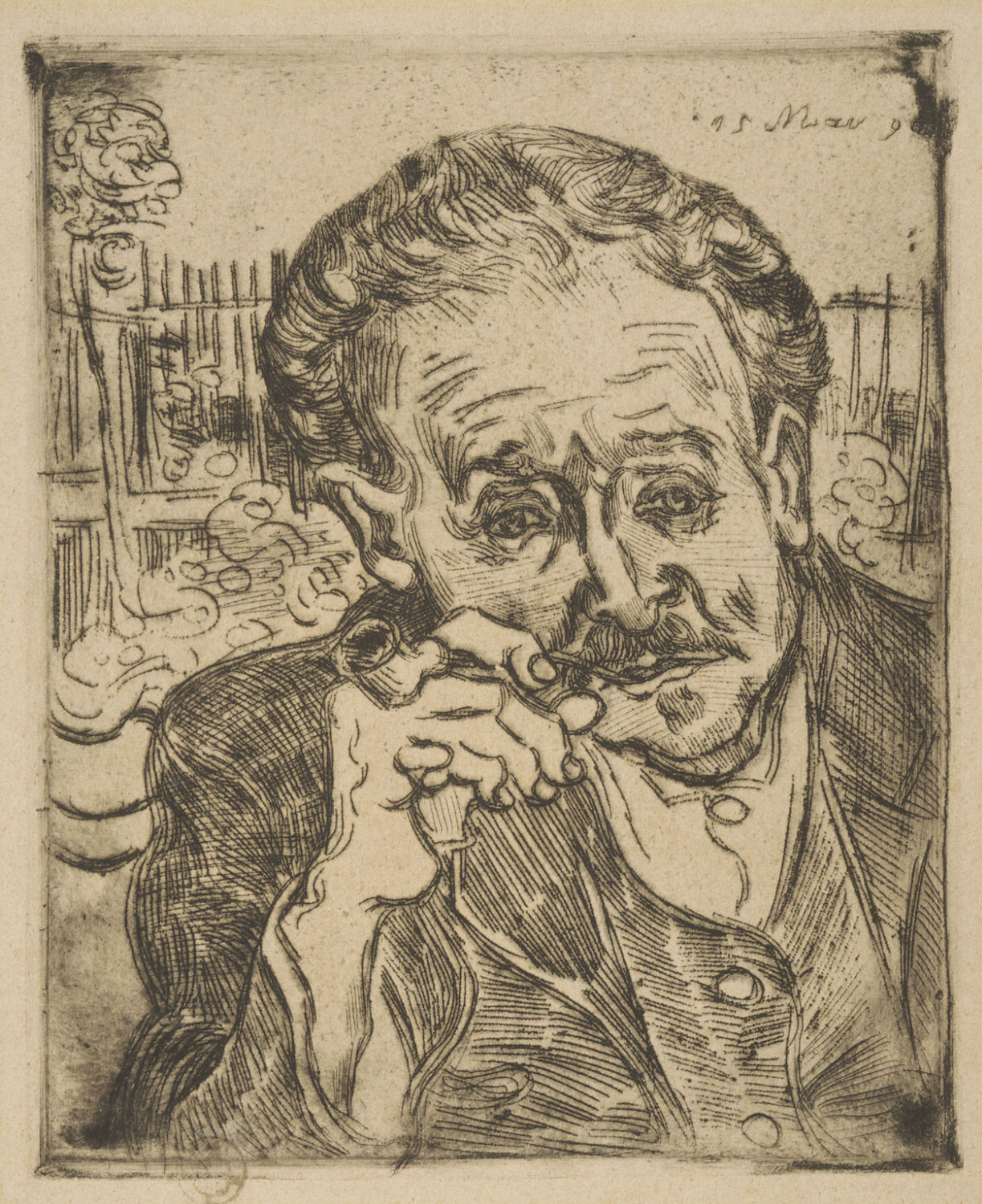
Dr. Gachet, etching by Vincent van Gogh (1890)

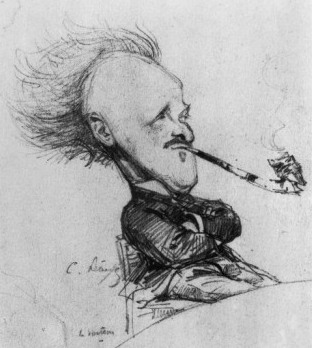
Paul Gachet by Charles Leandre (c. 1887)

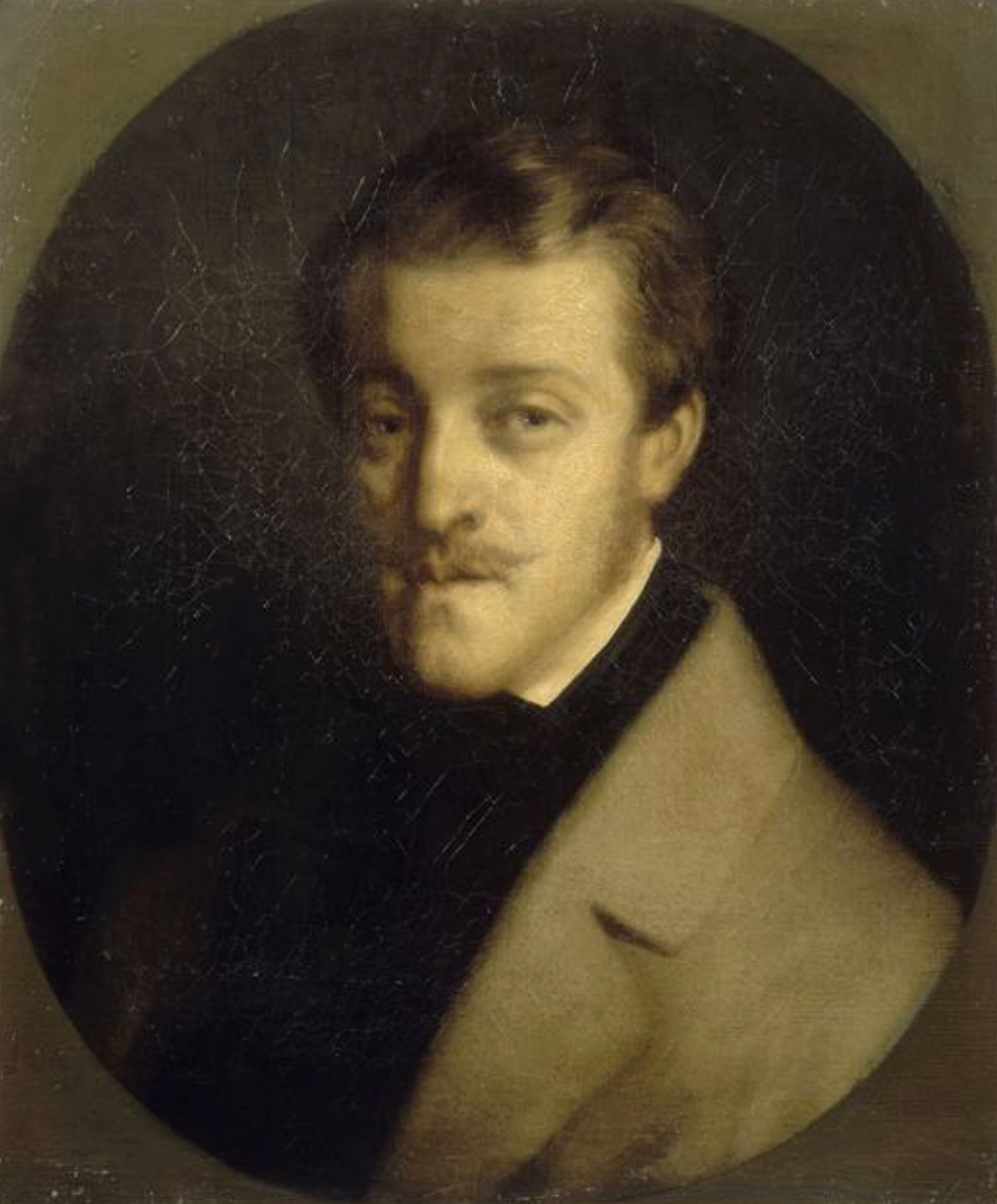
Paul Gachet by Ambroise Detrez (1850-1852)

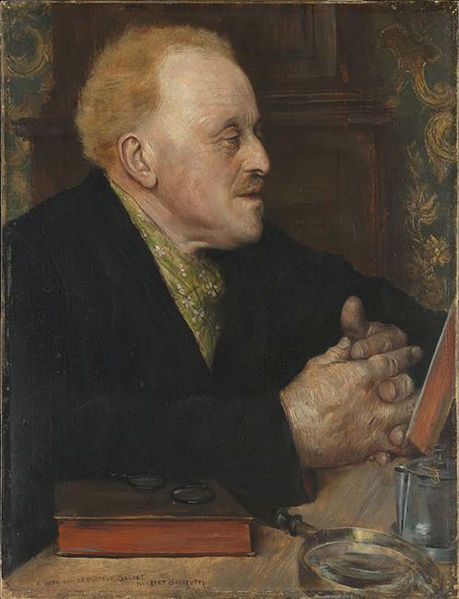
Paul Gachet, painting by Norbert Goeneutte (1891), Musée d'Orsay, Paris

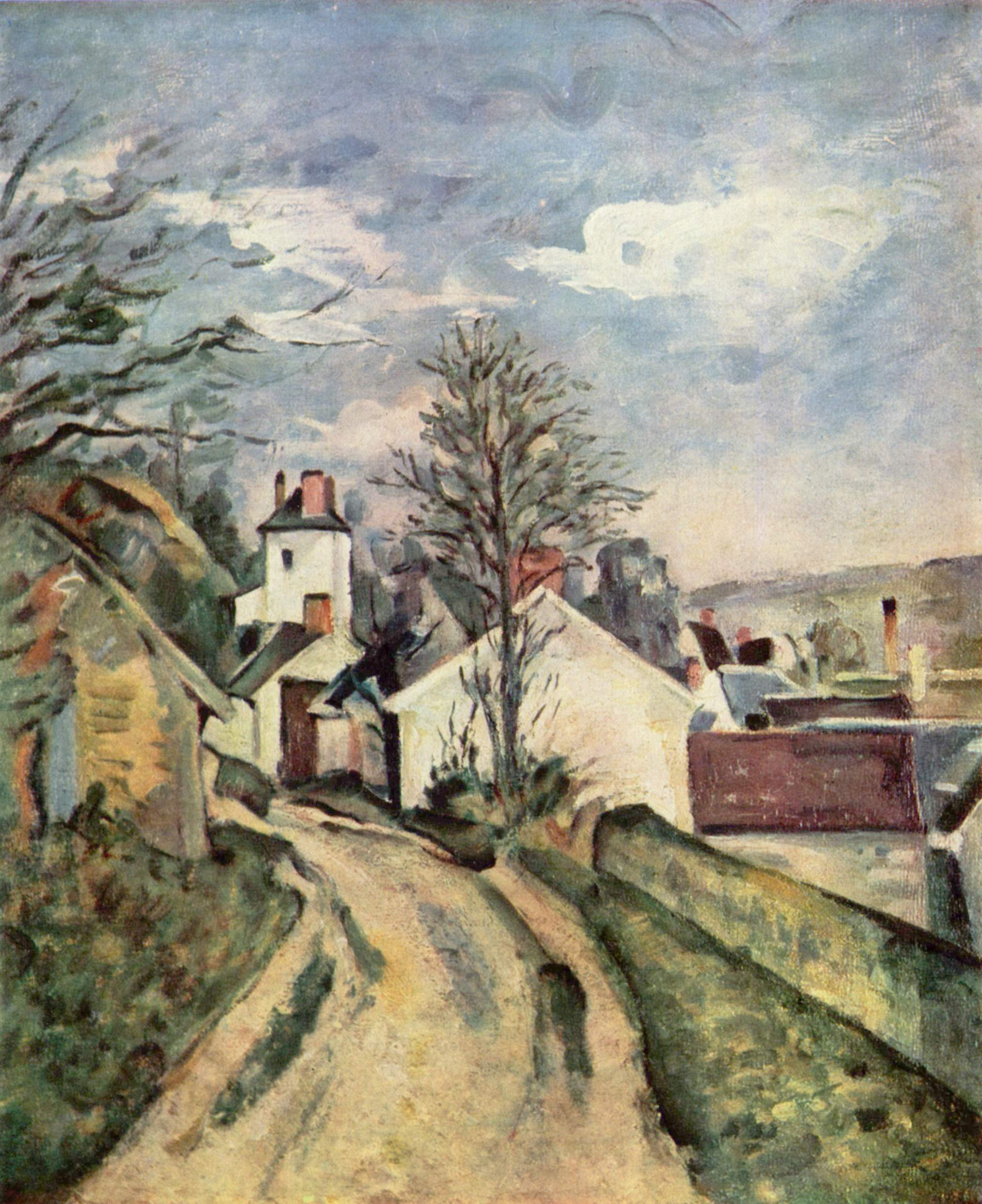
Paul Cézanne, The House of Doctor Gachet in Auvers (1872-1873) Musée d’Orsay

== Portrayals ==
Everett Sloane played Gachet in Vincente Minnelli’s Lust for Life.

Gachet is prominently featured in Maurice Pialat's 1991 film Van Gogh where he is played by Gérard Séty.

Mathieu Amalric plays Gachet in Julian Schnabel's At Eternity's Gate, which depicts van Gogh (Willem Dafoe) painting Gachet's portrait in one scene.

Jerome Flynn plays Gachet in the 2017 film Loving Vincent (notable for being animated entirely through oil paintings in van Gogh's style), in a scene where he discusses his own role in Vincent's final days.

== In popular culture ==
"Dr. Gachet", a song written and sung by Rod MacDonald in 1997, tells the painting's history and notes "the painting Van Gogh couldn't sell / has become too valuable / for anyone to ever see again."
