= Lola Kramarsky =

- Born: Violet Ingeborg Else Popper; 1896; Hamburg, Germany
- Died: February 28, 1991 (aged 95); Manhattan, New York
- Spouse: Siegfried Kramarsky (m. 1921; died 1961)

Violet "Lola" Ingeborg Else Kramarsky (née Popper; 1896 – February 28, 1991) was president of Hadassah Women's Zionist Organization of America from 1960 to 1964. She died in 1991. She was married to Siegfried Kramarsky from 1921 until his death in 1961.
