= Flowering Orchards =

Series of paintings by Vincent van Gogh

Pink Peach Tree in Blossom (Reminiscence of Mauve)
- Souvenir de Mauve (French)
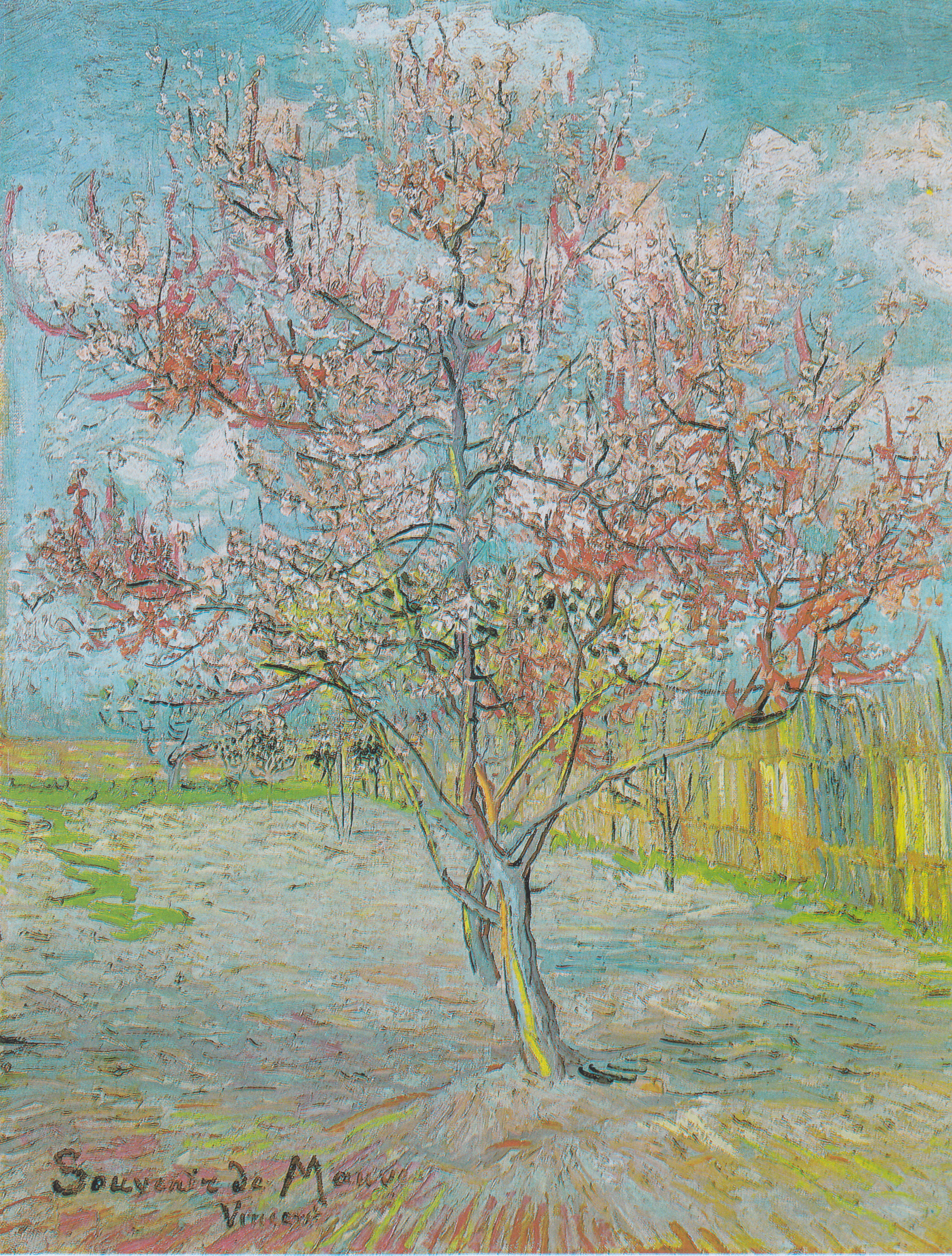
- Artist: Vincent van Gogh
- Year: 1888
- Catalogue: F394; JH1379
- Medium: Oil on canvas
- Dimensions: 73 cm × 59.5 cm (29 in × 23.4 in)
- Location: Kröller-Müller Museum; Otterlo

Flowering Orchards is a series of paintings which Dutch artist Vincent van Gogh executed in Arles, in southern France in the spring of 1888. Van Gogh arrived in Arles in February 1888 in a snowstorm; within two weeks the weather changed and the fruit trees were in blossom. Appreciating the symbolism of rebirth, Van Gogh worked with optimism and zeal on about fourteen paintings of flowering trees in the early spring. He also made paintings of flowering trees in Saint-Rémy the following year, in 1889.

Flowering trees were special to Van Gogh; they represented awakening and hope. He enjoyed them aesthetically and found joy in painting flowering trees. The 'trees and orchards in bloom' paintings that he made reflect Impressionist, Divisionist and Japanese woodcut influences.

== Flowering trees and orchards ==
When Van Gogh arrived in Arles in February 1888, the area's fruit trees in the orchards were about to bloom. The blossoms of the apricot, peach and plum trees motivated him, and within a month he had created fourteen paintings of blossoming fruit trees. Excited by the subject matter, he completed nearly one painting a day. Around April 21 Van Gogh wrote to his brother Theo, that he "will have to seek something new, now the orchards have almost finished blossoming."

Flowering trees represented a source of spiritual renewal for Van Gogh; in 1883 he had written of the symbolism of the flowering tree, seeing the evidence of rebirth like the "man who finally produces something poignant as the blossom of a hard, difficult life, is a wonder, like the black hawthorn, or better still the gnarled old apple tree which at certain moments bears blossoms which are among the most delicate and virginal things under the sun."

In 1888 Van Gogh became inspired in southern France and began the most productive period of his painting career. He sought the brilliance and light of the sun which would obscure the detail, simplifying the subjects. It also would make the lines of composition clearer; which would suit his ambition to create the simple patterns that he appreciated in Japanese woodblocks. Arles, he said, was "the Japan of the South." Van Gogh found in the south that colors were more vivid. Pairs of complementary colors, such as "the red and green of the plants, the woven highlights of oranges and blue in the fence, even the pink clouds that enliven the turquoise sky" — create an intensity through their pairing.

Mancoff says of flowering trees and this work,

"In his flowering trees, Vincent attained a sense of spontaneity, freeing himself from the strict self-analytical approach he took in Paris. In Almond Tree in Blossom, Vincent used the light, broken strokes of impressionism and the dabs of colour of divisionism for a sparkling surface effect. The distinctive contours of the tree and its position in the foreground recall the formal qualities of Japanese prints."

The southern region and the flowering trees seems to have awakened Van Gogh from his doldrums into a state of clear direction, hyper-activity and good cheer. He wrote, "I am up to my ears in work for the trees are in blossom and I want to paint a Provençal orchard of astonishing gaiety." While in the past a very active period would have drained him, this time he was invigorated.

To paint the flowering orchards, Van Gogh contended with the winds which were so strong that he drove pegs into the ground to which he fastened his easel. Even so, he found painting the orchards "too lovely" to miss.

== Flowering orchard triptych ==
Van Gogh may have envisioned several triptychs of his paintings of orchards and flowering trees. However, only one triptych grouping has been documented, one which Vincent envisioned and sketched for Theo's apartment. Johanna van Gogh-Bonger displayed them in the apartment according to Van Gogh's sketch, the vertical Pink Peach Tree between the Pink Orchard and the White Orchard.

=== Pink Orchard ===
In Paris, Van Gogh had learned to paint more than what one sees, but what it should be. He felt Pink Orchard was an example of wise use of that technique, such as leaving a field blank behind the orchard to create the feeling of distance. The way in which he outlined the bark of the tree indicates influence of the Japanese prints that he greatly admired. Using an Impressionist technique of placing colors side by side, Van Gogh makes short dots or brush strokes of colors to represent grass. On the top of the tree he uses rougher, more impasto brushstrokes to represent the colorful blossoms. Vincent asked Theo to "shave off" some of the impasto in this painting. Apparently he did not reline, a process of heavy pressure and heat to flatten the surface, because sharp edges of thick impasto remain on the canvas.

=== Pink Peach Tree ===
In the Pink Peach Tree, center of the triptych, the bright pink in the painting has faded over time and looks more white than pink now.

Van Gogh wrote of his approach, perhaps due to the challenges of painting in the mistral winds, and use of color in painting the flowering tree like the Pink Peach Tree:

"At the moment I am absorbed in the blooming fruit trees, pink peach trees, yellow-white pear trees. My brush stroke has no system at all. I hit the canvas with irregular touches of the brush, which I leave as they are. Patches of thickly laid-on color, spots of canvas left uncovered, here and there portions that are absolutely unfinished, repetitions, savageries… Working direct on the spot all the time, I try to grasp what is essential in the drawings -- later I fill in the spaces which are bounded by contours — either expressed or not, but in any case felt — with tones which are also simplified, by which I mean that all that is going to be soil will have the same violet-like tone, that the whole sky will have a blue tint, that the green vegetation will be either green-blue or green-yellow, purposefully exaggerating the yellows and blues in this case."

=== White Orchard ===
Continuing on with his paintings of orchards, Van Gogh wrote, "At the moment I am working on some plum trees, yellowish-white, with thousands of black branches." Two days later he wrote of the same painting, "This morning I worked on an orchard of plum trees in bloom; all at once a fierce wind sprang up, an effect I had seen nowhere else but here, and returned at intervals. The sun shone in between, and all the little white flowers sparkled. It was so lovely. My friend the Dane came to join me, and I went on painting at the risk and peril of seeing the whole show on the ground at any moment - it's a white effect with a good deal of yellow in it, and blue and lilac, the sky white and blue."

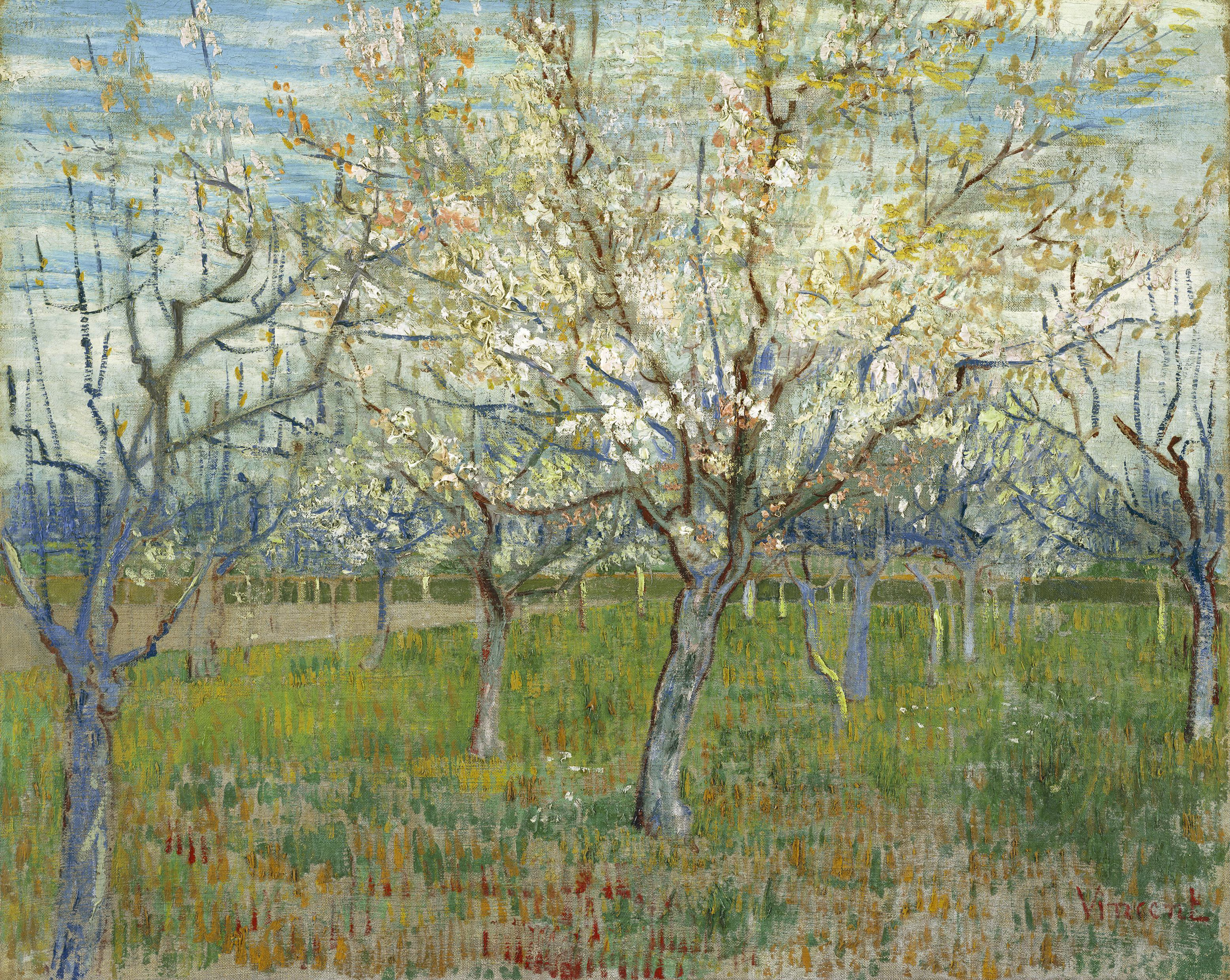
The Pink Orchard also Orchard with Blossoming Apricot Trees
March 1888
Van Gogh Museum, Amsterdam (F555)

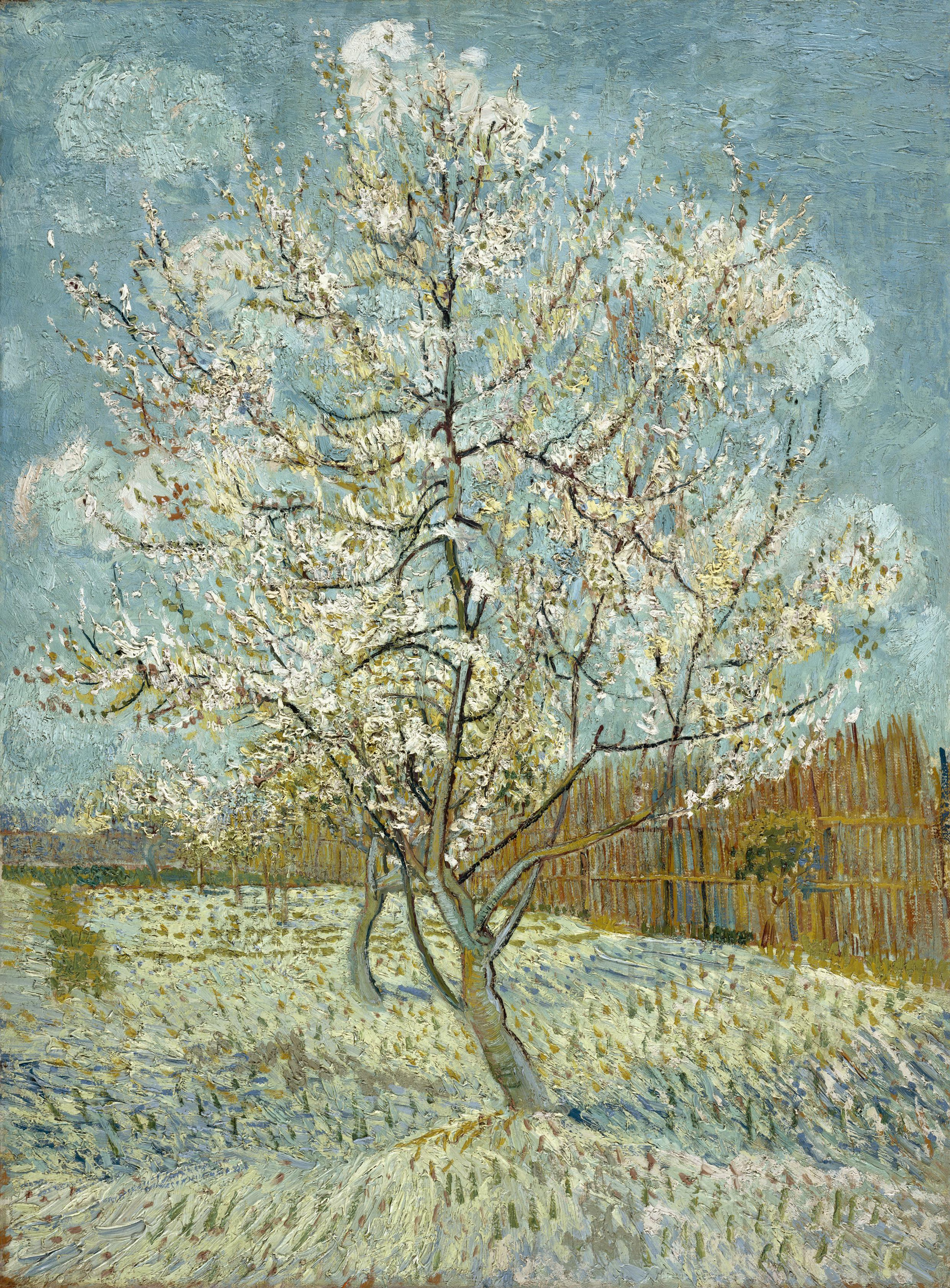
Pink Peach Tree or Peach Tree in Blossom
March–April 1888
Van Gogh Museum, Amsterdam (F404)

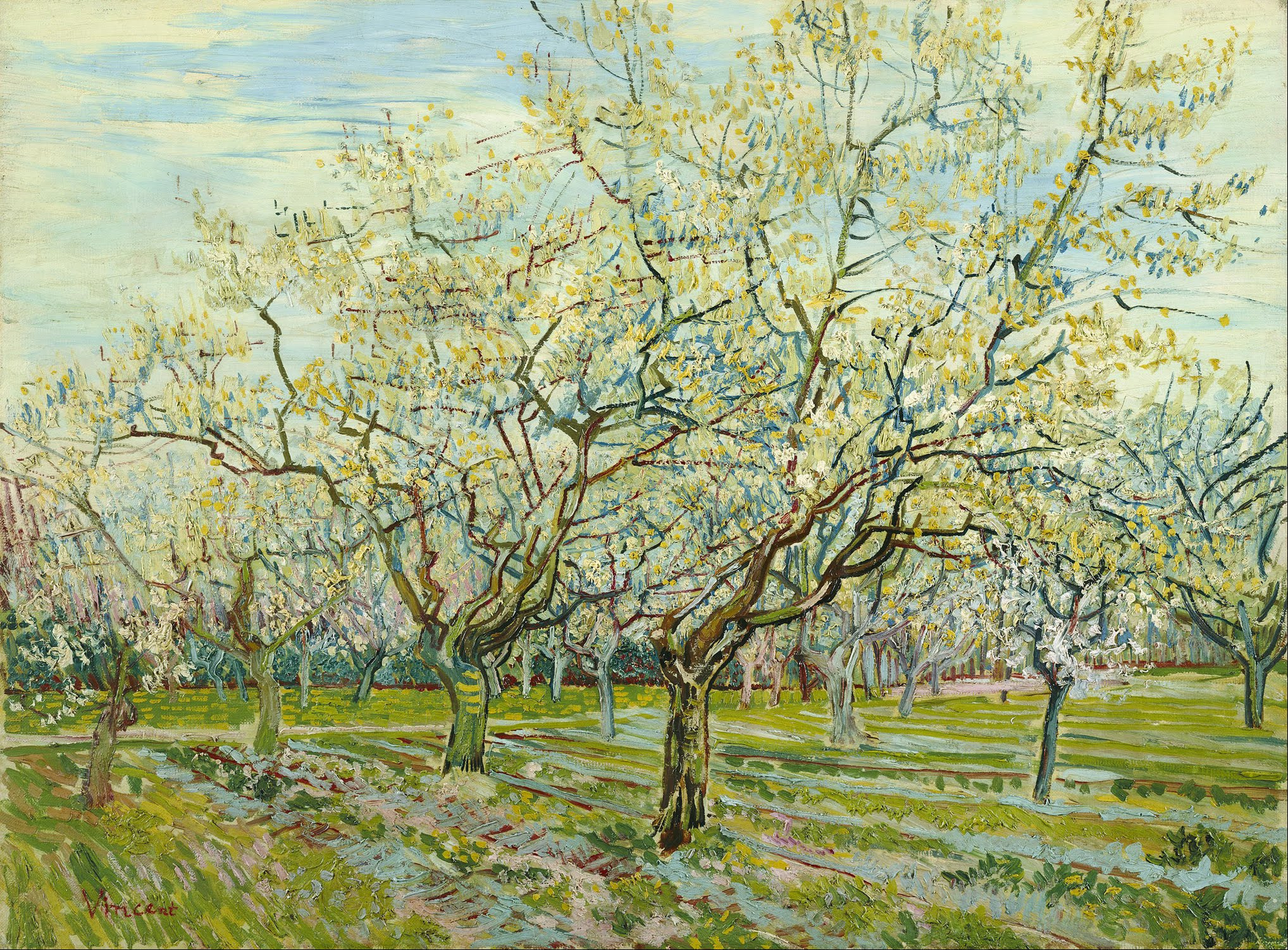
The White Orchard
April 1888
Van Gogh Museum, Amsterdam (F403)

== Center piece for a second triptych: Blossoming Pear Tree ==
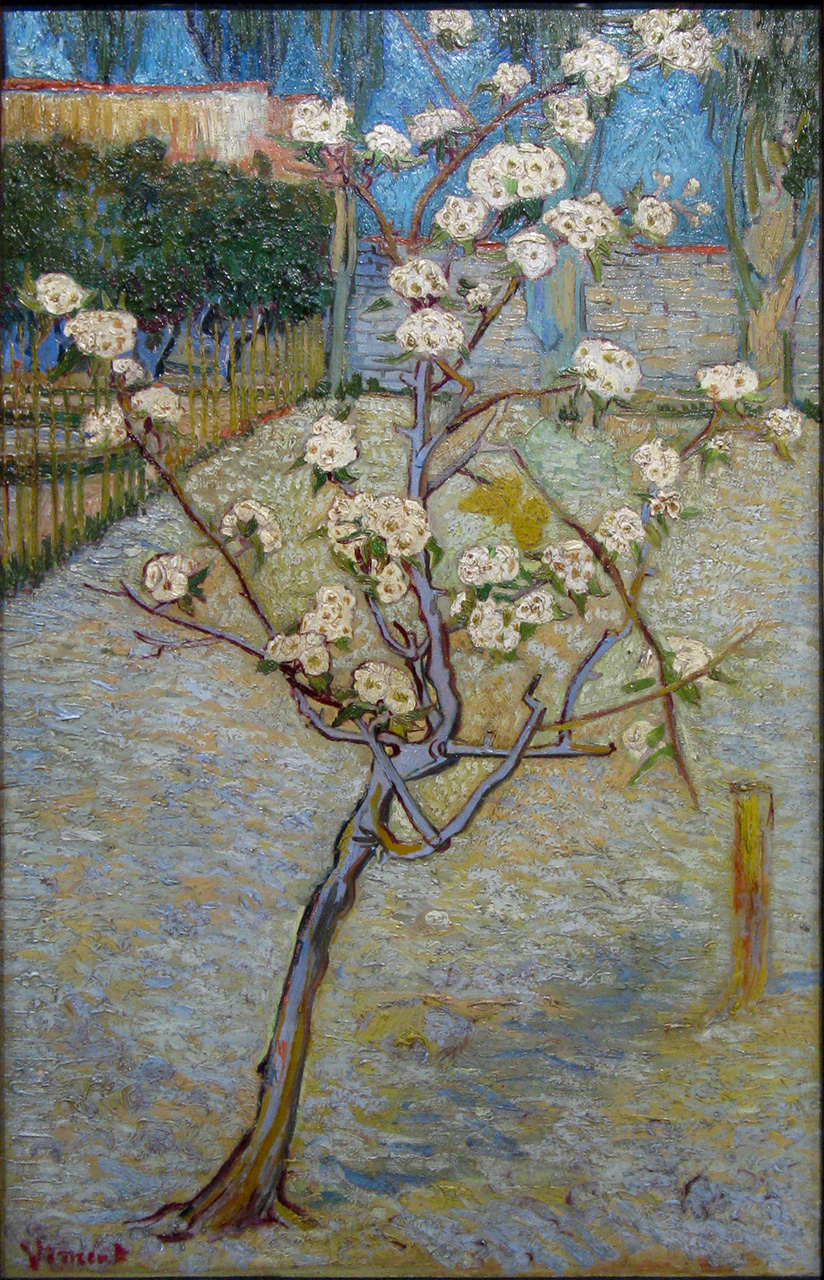
Blossoming Pear Tree, 73 x 46 cm, March 1888, Van Gogh Museum, Amsterdam (F405)

Van Gogh chose Blossoming Pear Tree as the center piece of a grouping, However, there is no information linking this painting to any others.

The Van Gogh Museum described Van Gogh's approach and technique when he made Blossoming Pear Tree:

He chose a high vantage point, creating a contrast between the angular trunk and branches with their dark, heavy contours and the light background. A stone wall and a few trees can be seen to the rear, while to the left is a fence in front of a garden near a pink-yellow house. The large, flat yellow butterfly among the flowers to the right of the trunk is also noteworthy. The decorative painting, with the small tree in the foreground, the high vantage point and the lack of depth, is strongly influenced by the art of the Japanese printmakers, which Van Gogh admired enormously.

It is difficult to overstate the impact that Japanese art had on Van Gogh. In a letter to Theo, he said, "All my work is in a way founded on Japanese art, and we do not know enough about Japanese prints. In decadence in its own country, pigeonholed in collections already impossible to find in Japan itself, Japanese art is taking root again among French Impressionist artists."

== Specific trees ==
=== Almond Tree in Blossom ===
Van Gogh writes of the weather and that the almond trees are coming into full flower, "The weather here is changeable, often windy with turbulent skies, but the almond trees are beginning to flower everywhere." The rendering of Almond Tree in Blossom is positioned close and accessible to the viewer, and the branches appear to extend beyond the painting's frame. A yellow butterfly flits among the pink blossoms growing on the red branches. The subject is reminiscent of an earlier painting which Van Gogh made in Paris depicting flowering trees. Apricot Trees in Blossom was made in April 1888. It is now held in a private collection.

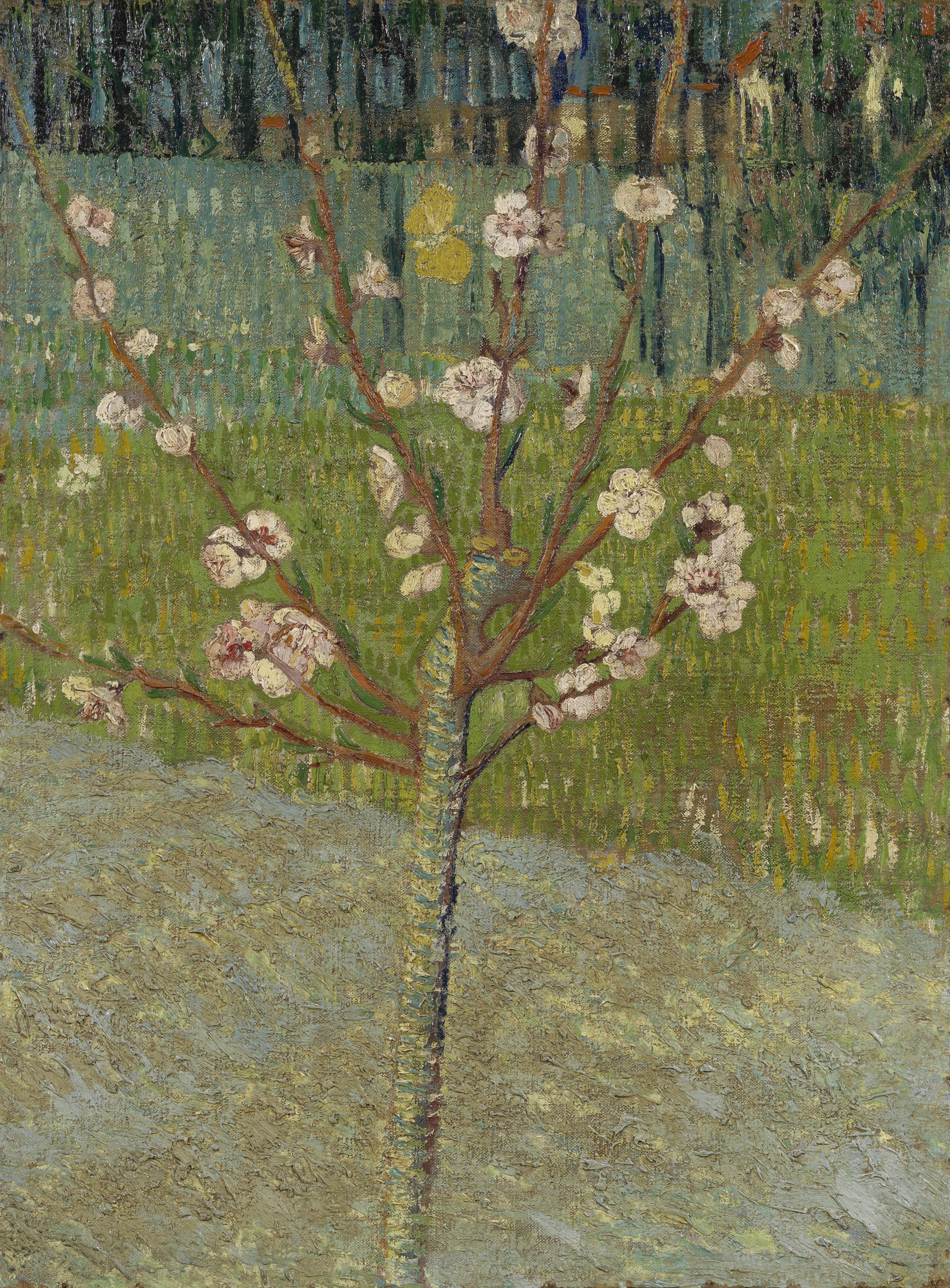
Almond Tree in Bloom
1888
Van Gogh Museum, Amsterdam (F557)

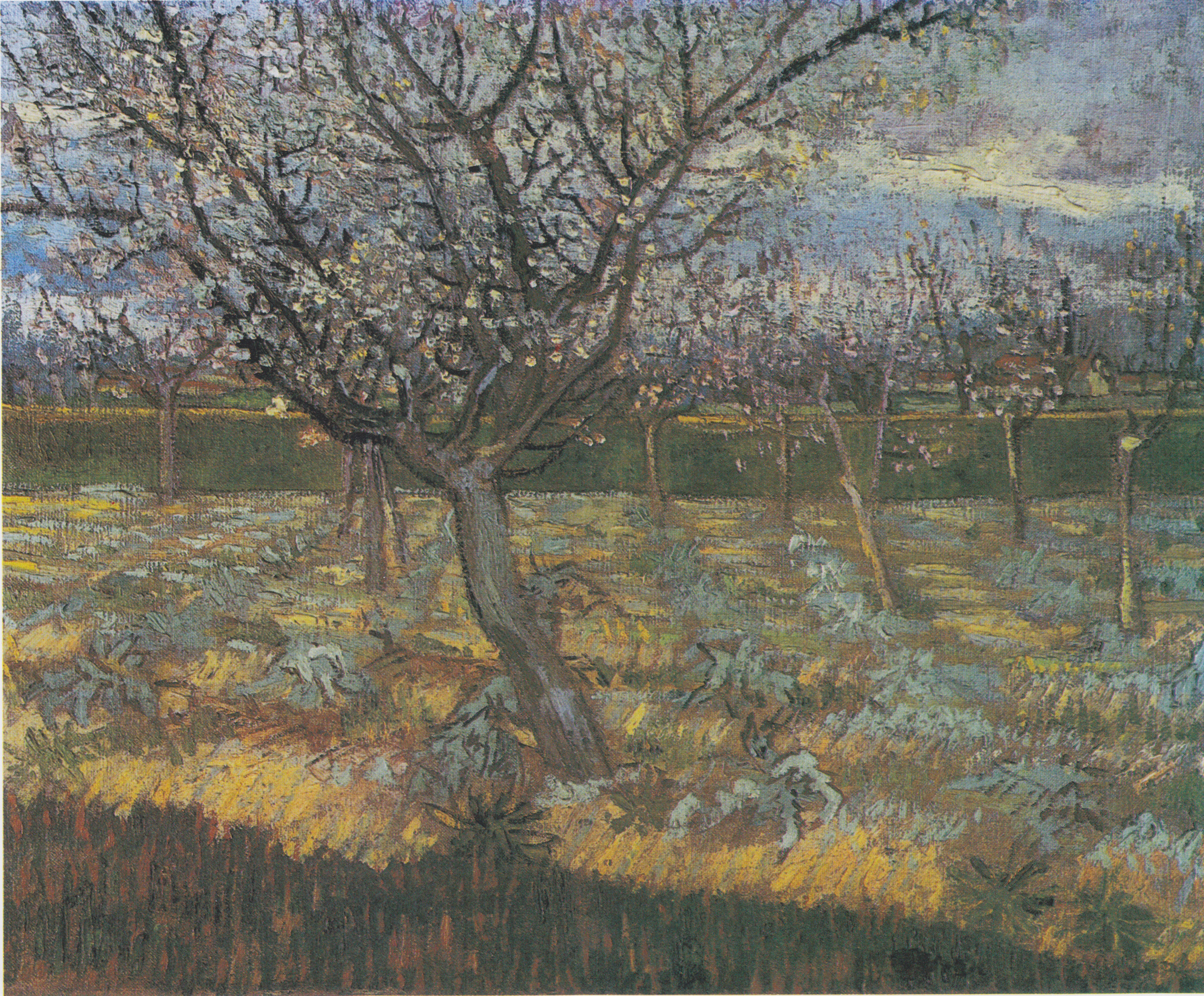
Apricot Trees in Blossom
April 1888
Private collection (F556)

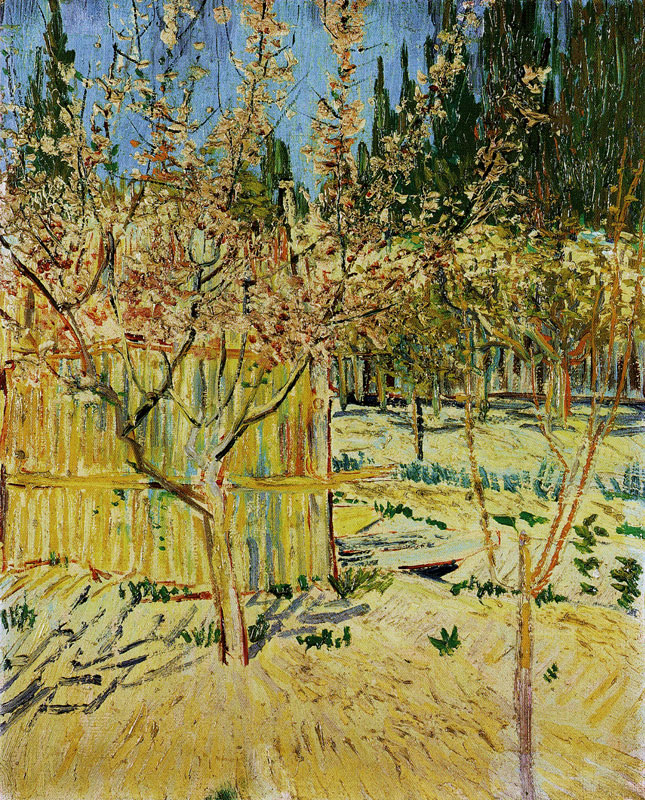
Apricot Trees in Blossom
1888
Collection Continental Art Holdings, Ltd., Johannesburg (F399)

=== Peach trees ===
In addition to Pink Peach Tree (F404) in the triptych, Van Gogh painted two other paintings of peach trees and a watercolor.

==== Orchard with Peach Trees in Blossom ====
The Van Gogh Museum's version of Orchard with Peach Trees in Blossom was painted in April. This may be the painting that Van Gogh referred to as one with a great deal of stippling that depicts an orchard surrounded by cypress trees. If so, Van Gogh intended it to be paired with another painting of the same size.

==== Pink Peach Tree, Souvenir to Mauve ====
Van Gogh wrote of Pink Peach Tree in Blossom (Souvenir de Mauve) that he completed in March, "I have been working on a size 20 canvas in the open air in an orchard, lilac ploughland, a reed fence, two pink peach trees against a sky of glorious blue and white. Probably the best landscape I have done. I had just brought it home when I received from our sister a Dutch notice in memory of Anton Mauve, with his portrait (the portrait, very good), the text, poor and nothing in it a pretty water color. Something - I don't know what - took hold of me and brought a lump to my throat, and I wrote on my picture, 'Souvenir de Mauve'." Van Gogh knew Anton Mauve during his stay in The Hague. Mauve had taken an interest in Van Gogh and encouraged him to work in color. Van Gogh asked that Pink Peach Tree be sent to Mauve's widow Jet. To his sister Wil, Van Gogh explained that he chose the particular painting because of the "delicate palette" to express his deep fondness. "It seemed to me that everything in memory of Mauve must be at once tender and very gay, and not a study in a graver key."

==== Watercolor of Pink Peach Trees ====
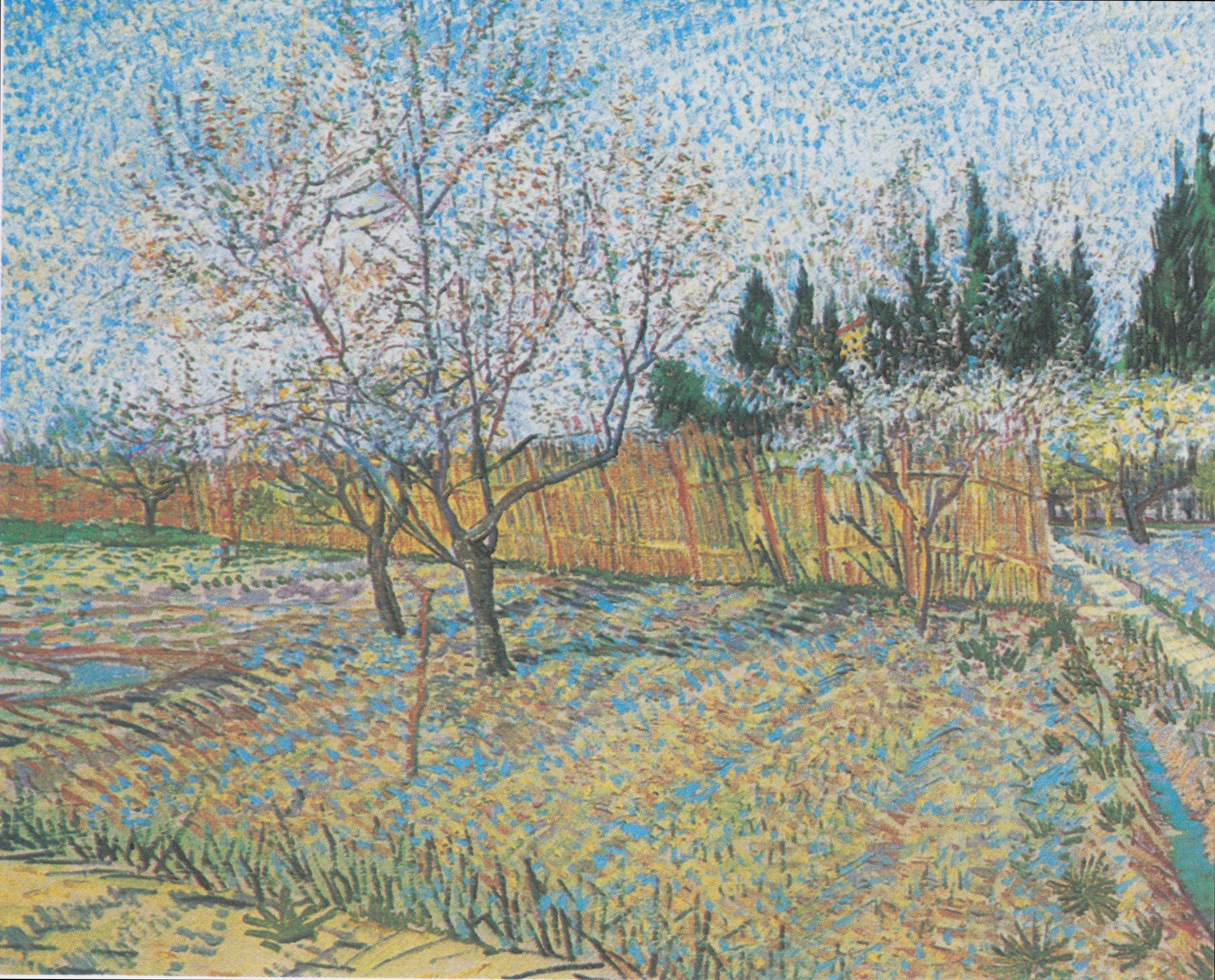
Orchard with Peach Trees in Blossom
April, 1888
Private collection (F551)

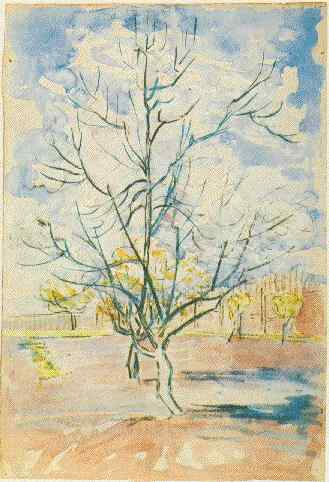
Pink Peach Trees, watercolor
April 1888
Van Gogh Museum, Amsterdam (F1469)

=== Orchard in Blossom (Plum Trees) ===
The National Gallery of Scotland described Orchard in Blossom (Plum Trees):

The structure of the branches of the plum trees is still clearly visible through the blossom and his brushstrokes follow the direction of the vertical tree trunks.

The presence of the glittery white blossoms and absence of leaves indicate that Van Gogh made this painting shortly after the tree flowered. The painting reflects Impressionist influences in the use of short brush strokes and projection of light.

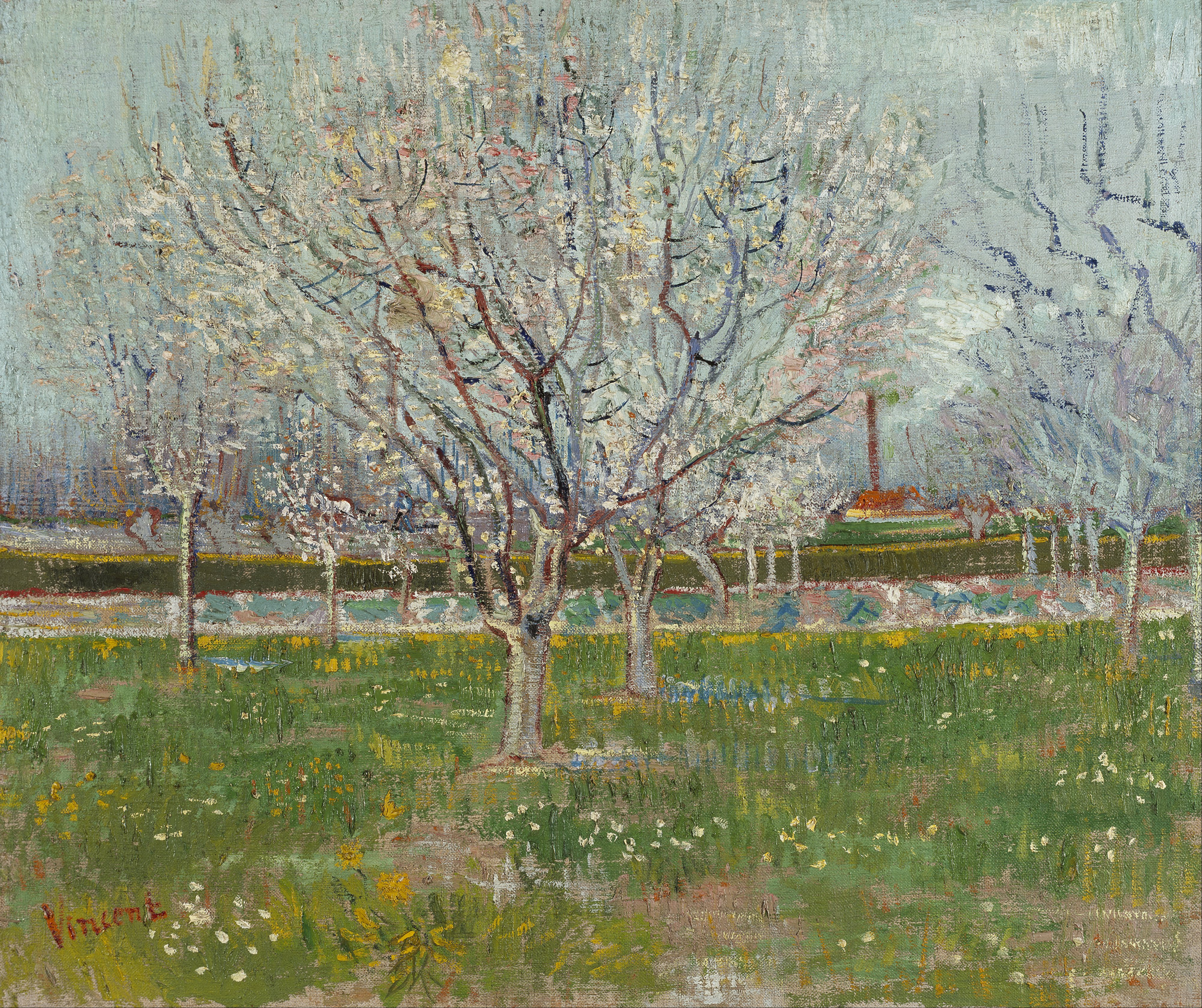
Orchard in Blossom (Plum Trees)April 1888 National Gallery of Scotland (F553)

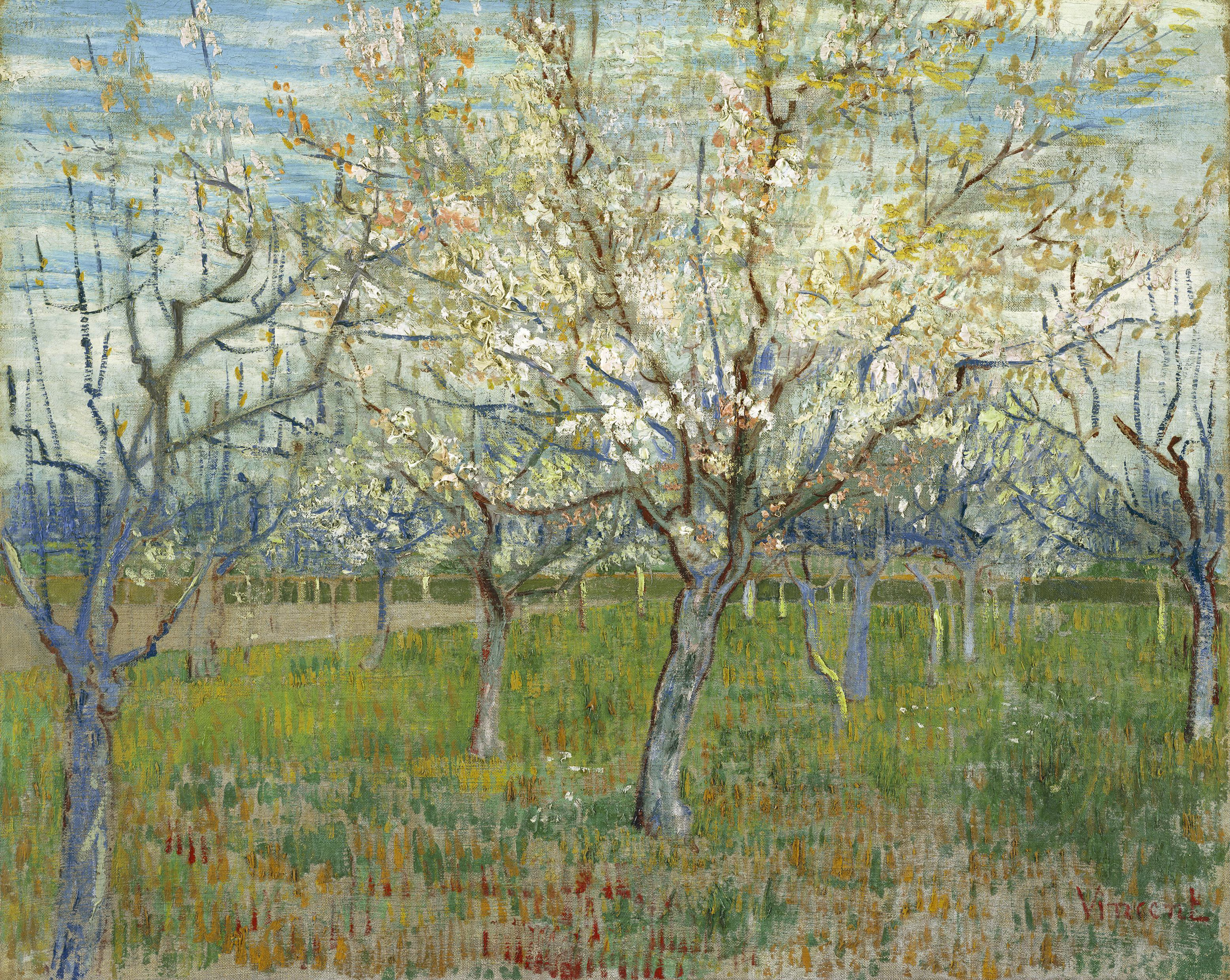
Flowering Orchard, 1888, Van Gogh Museum

== Orchard in Blossom, Bordered by Cypresses ==
To his friend Émile Bernard, Van Gogh wrote of his enthusiasm of painting orchards, "At the moment I am absorbed in the blooming fruit trees, pink peach trees, yellow-white pear trees. My brush stroke has no system at all. I hit the canvas with irregular touches of the brush, which I leave as they are. Patches of thickly laid-on colour, spots of canvas left uncovered, here or there portions that are left absolutely unfinished, repetitions, savageries; in short, I am inclined to think that the result is so disquieting and irritating as to be a godsend to those people who have preconceived ideas about technique." In the same letter he made a sketch of Orchard in Bloom, Bordered by Cypresses, "the entrance to a Provençal orchard with its yellow fences, its enclosure of black cypresses (against the mistral), its characteristic vegetables of varying greens: yellow lettuces, onions, garlic, emerald leeks."

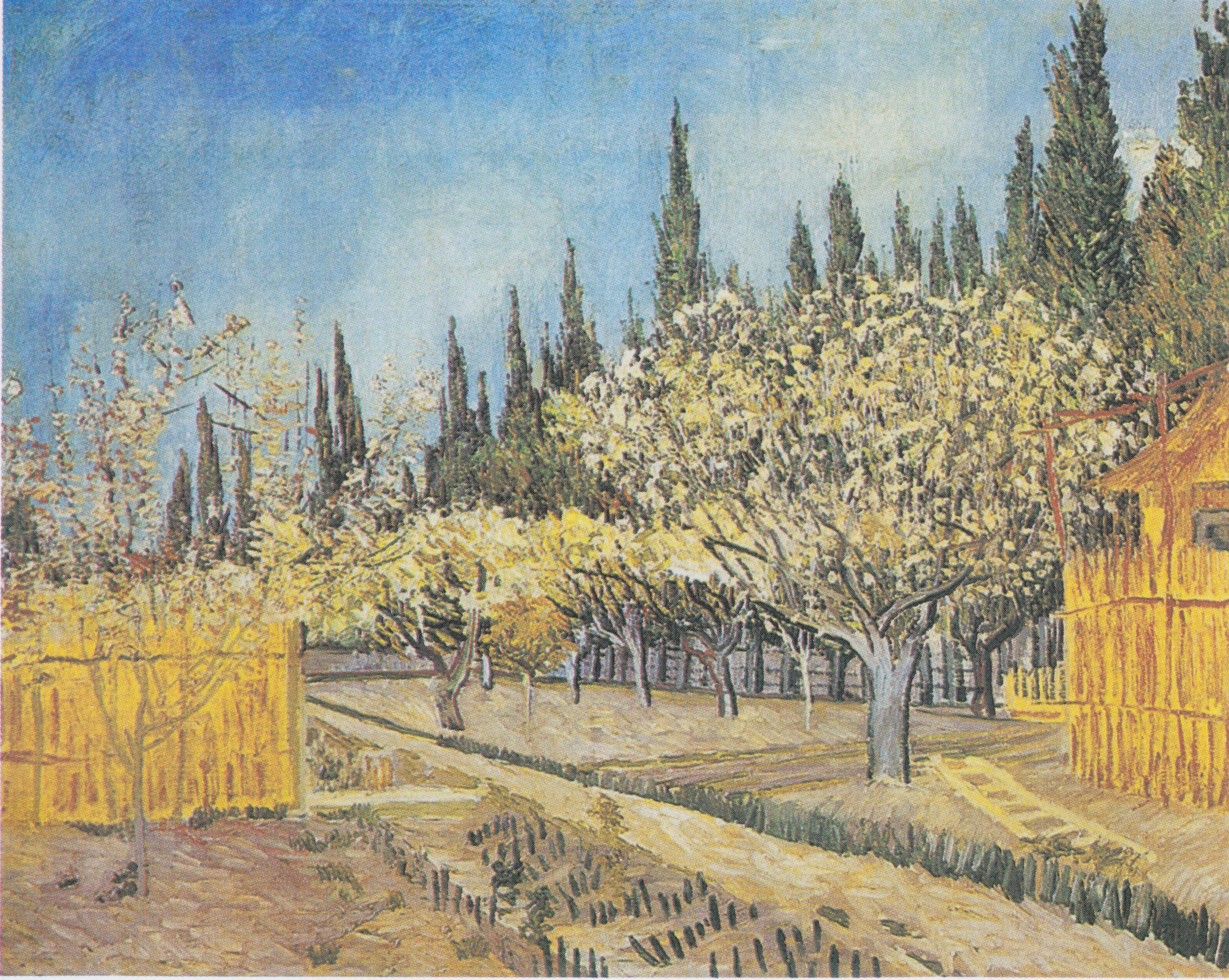
Orchard in Blossom, Bordered by Cypresses
April, 1888
Kröller-Müller Museum, Otterlo (F513)

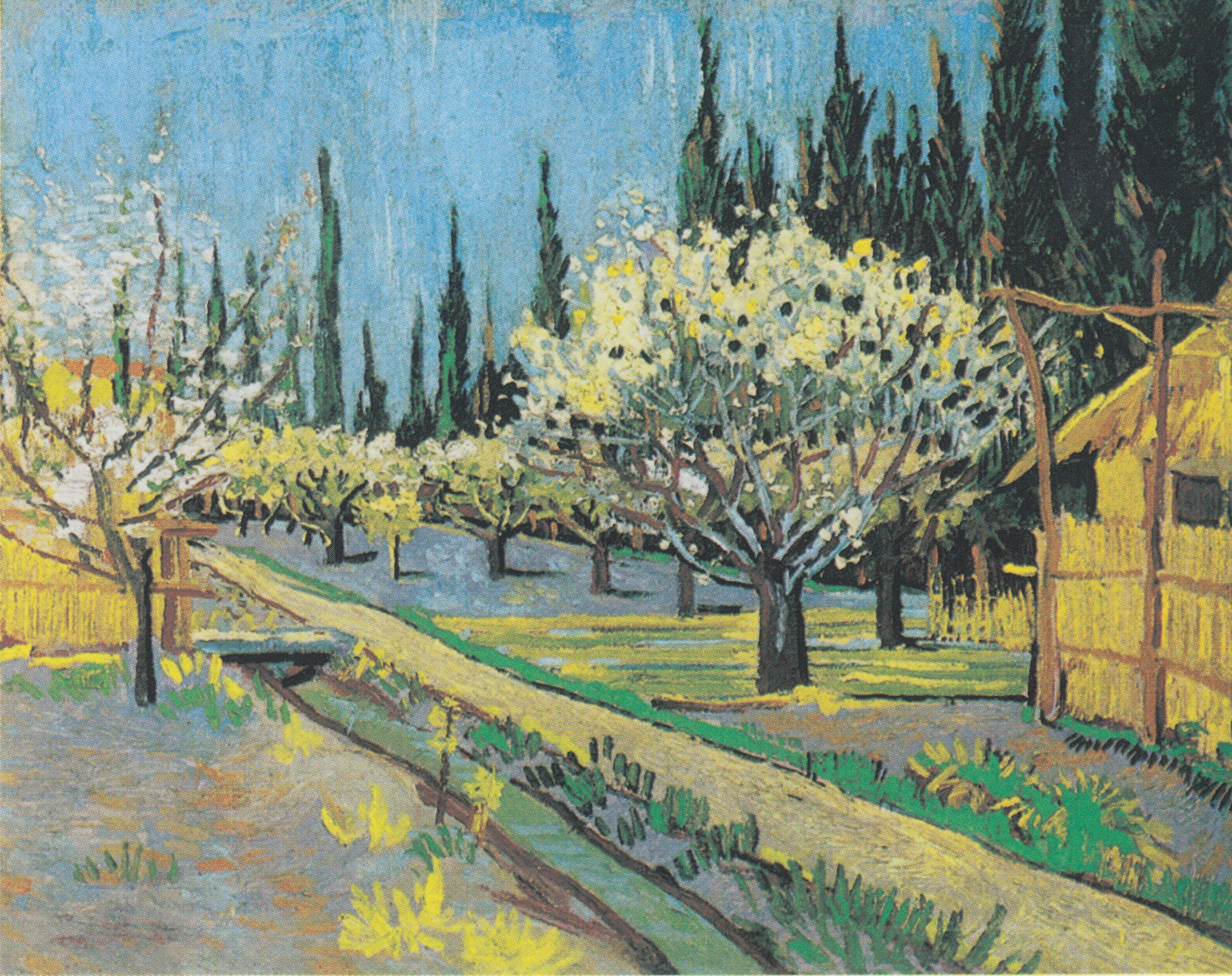
Orchard in Blossom, Bordered by Cypresses
April, 1888
Private Collection, promised to Yale University Art Gallery (F554)

== Other flowering orchard paintings ==
=== Orchard in Blossom (F406) ===
Orchard in Blossom (F406) was painted for Theo for May Day with "a frenzy of impastos of the faintest yellow and lilac on the original white mass." To his friend Émile Bernard he provided more detail: "Here is another orchard, rather simple as a composition: a white tree, a small green tree, a square patch of green, lilac soil, an orange roof, a large blue sky."

=== Orchard in Blossom (F511) ===
The Van Gogh Museum's version of Orchard in Blossom was painted in April. Vincent asked Theo to "shave off" some of the impasto in this painting. Apparently he did not reline, a process of heavy pressure and heat to flatten the surface, because sharp edges of thick impasto remain on the painting.

=== View of Arles, Flowering Orchards ===
Van Gogh painted View of Arles, Flowering Orchards in spring 1889. It provides a view across a canal, with poplar trees along its banks, toward the historical center of Arles, with the towers of Saint-Trophime and Notre-Dame-le-major to the left, contrasted by recent building of the casern housing the Zouave Regiment to the right. Van Gogh incorporated this painting in his selection of works to be displayed at Les XX, in Brussels 1890.

=== Flowering Orchard ===
The Metropolitan Museum of Art notes that Flowering Orchard is one of only two orchard paintings from Van Gogh's orchard series that alludes to human labor, in this instance by including a scythe and a rake. Japanese influence is understood from Van Gogh's stylized treatment and motif. The painting is also known as Orchard in Blossom, another English translation of its French title.

=== View of Arles with Trees in Blossom ===
Most of these paintings were done in April 1888, or in April 1889.

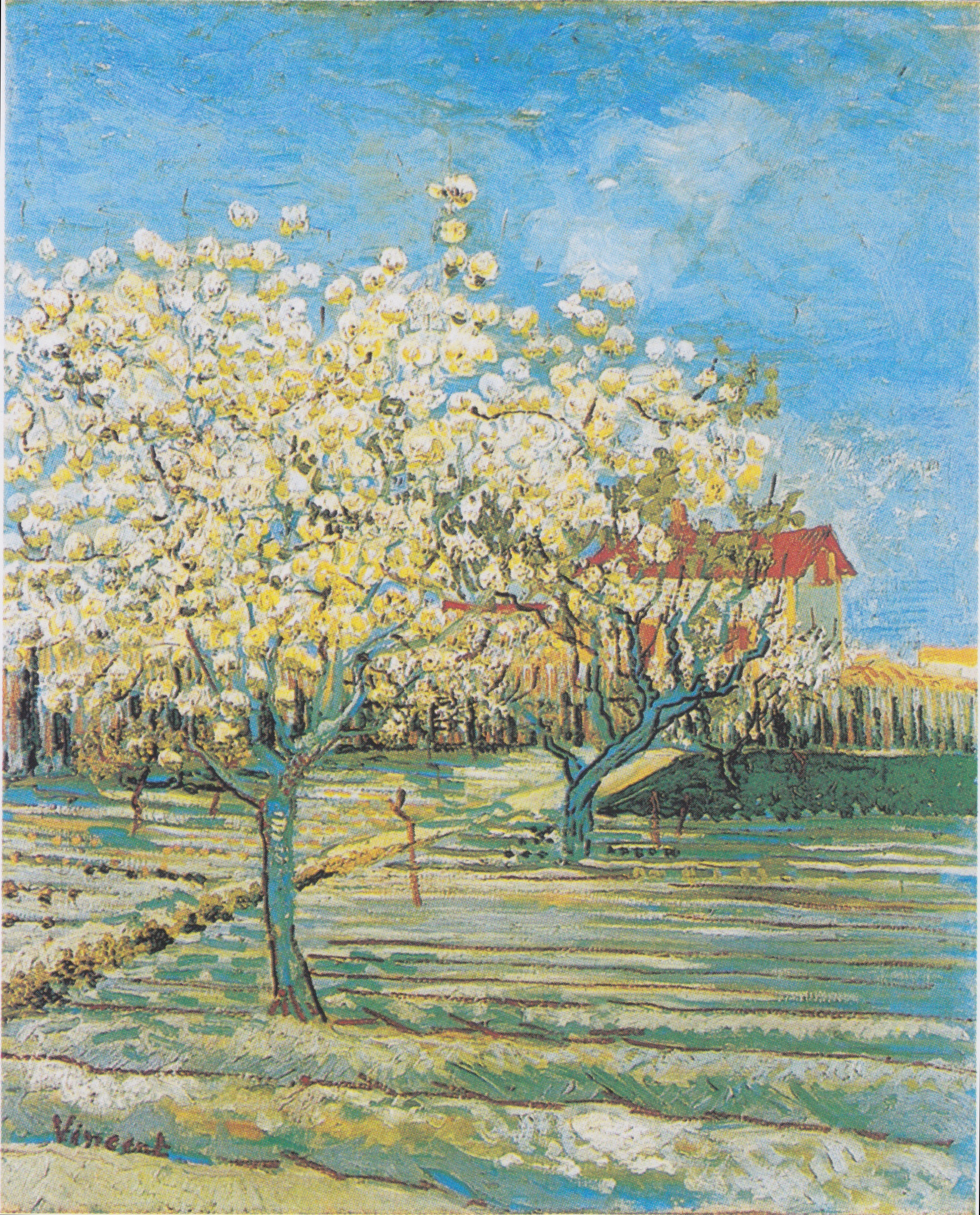
Orchard in Blossom
April 1888
Private collection (F406)

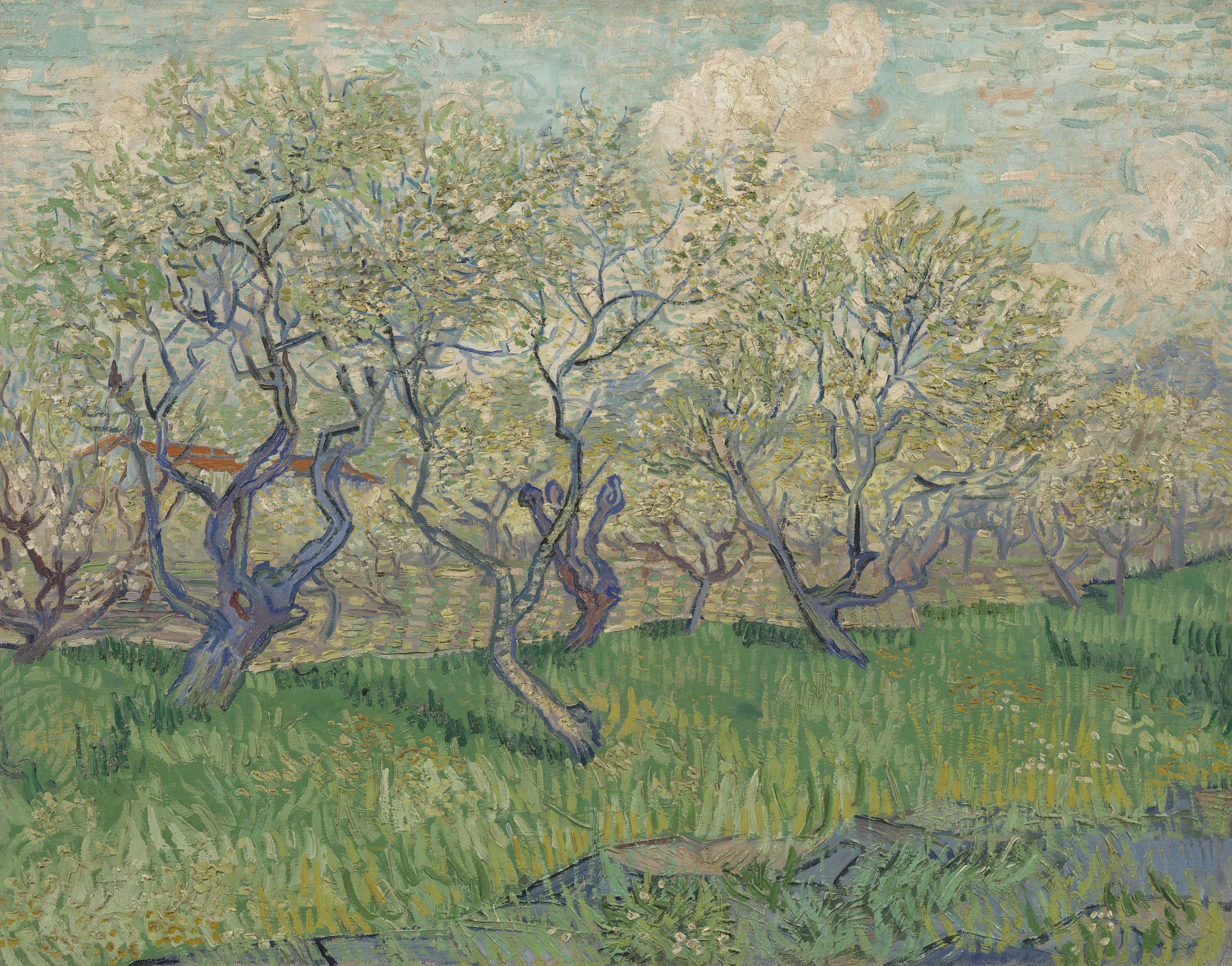
Orchard in Blossom
April 1888
Van Gogh Museum, Amsterdam (F511)

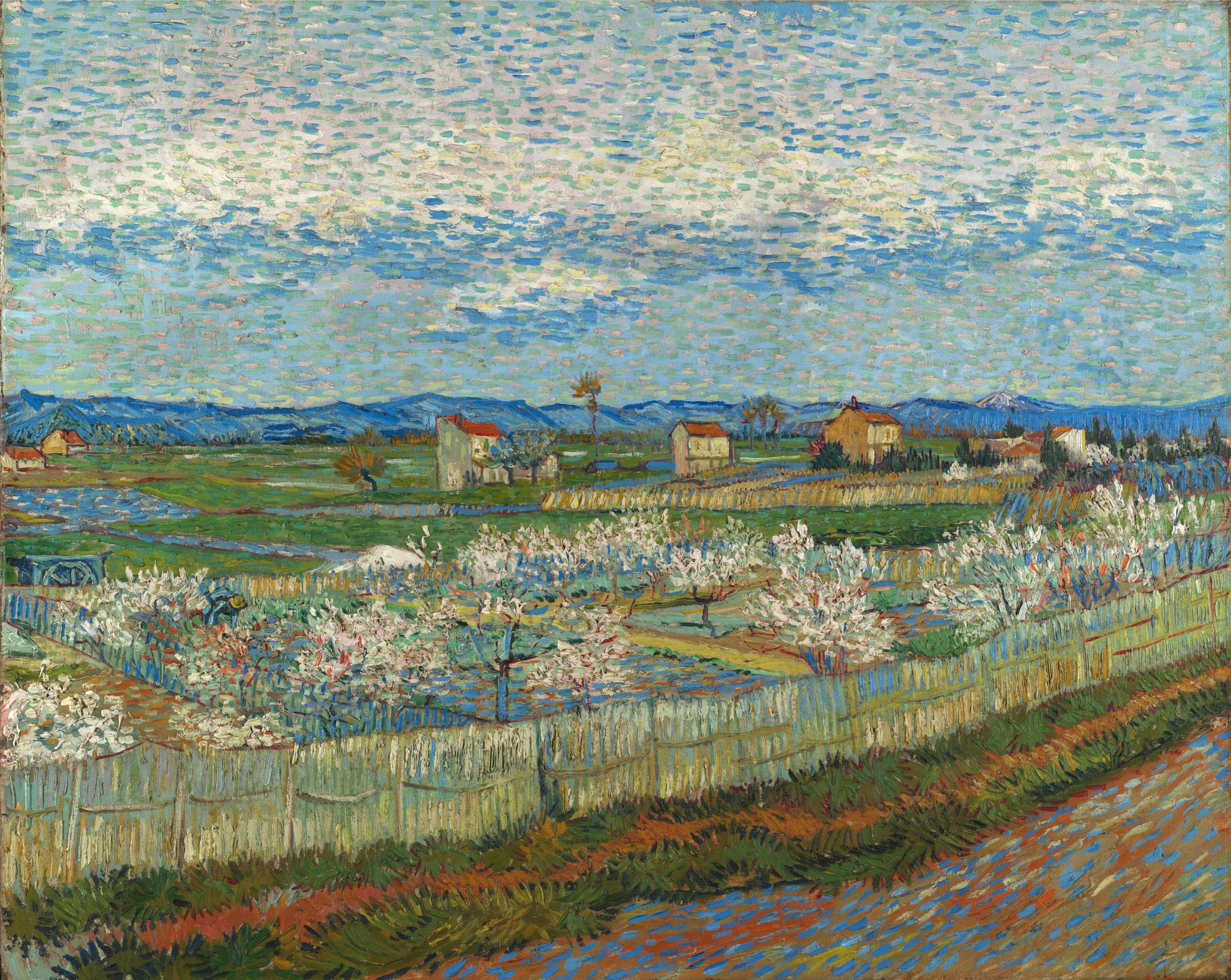
Peach Trees in Blossom
April 1888
Courtauld Gallery, London (F514)

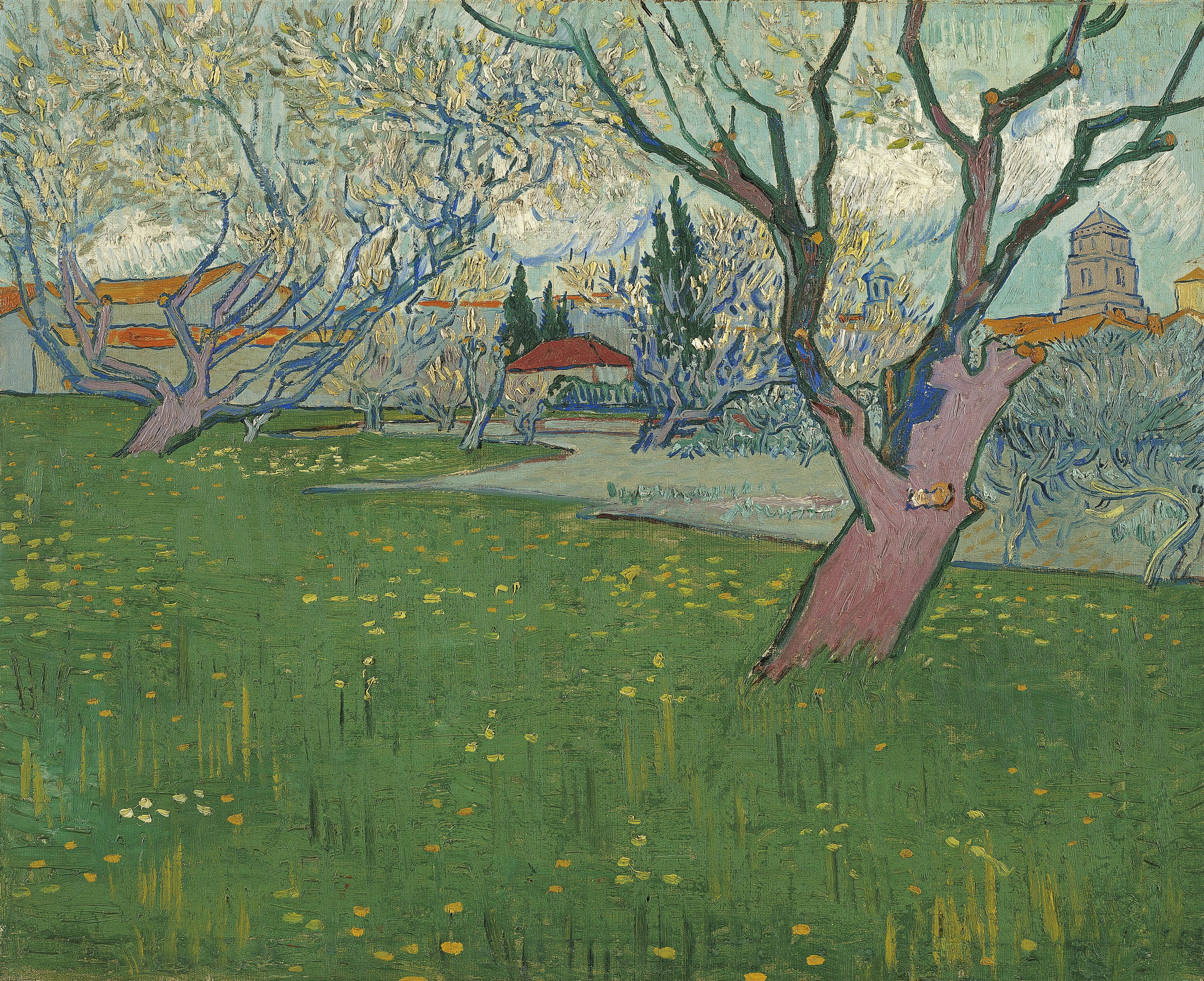
View of Arles with Trees in Blossom (Orchard in Bloom with View of Arles)
(April 1889)
Van Gogh Museum, Amsterdam (F515)

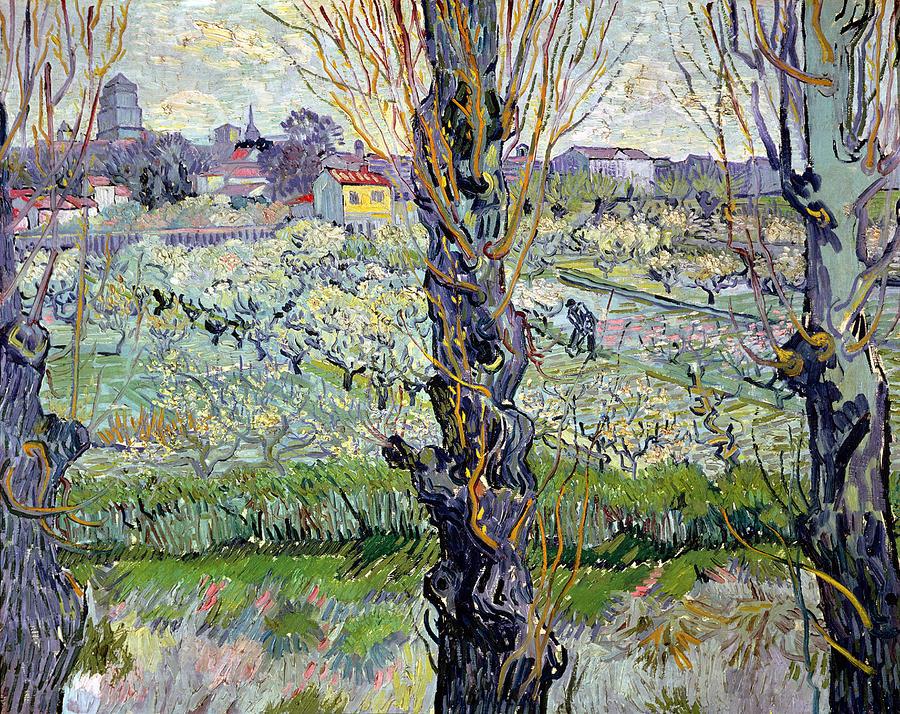
View of Arles (Flowering Orchards),
April 1889
Neue Pinakothek, Munich (F516)

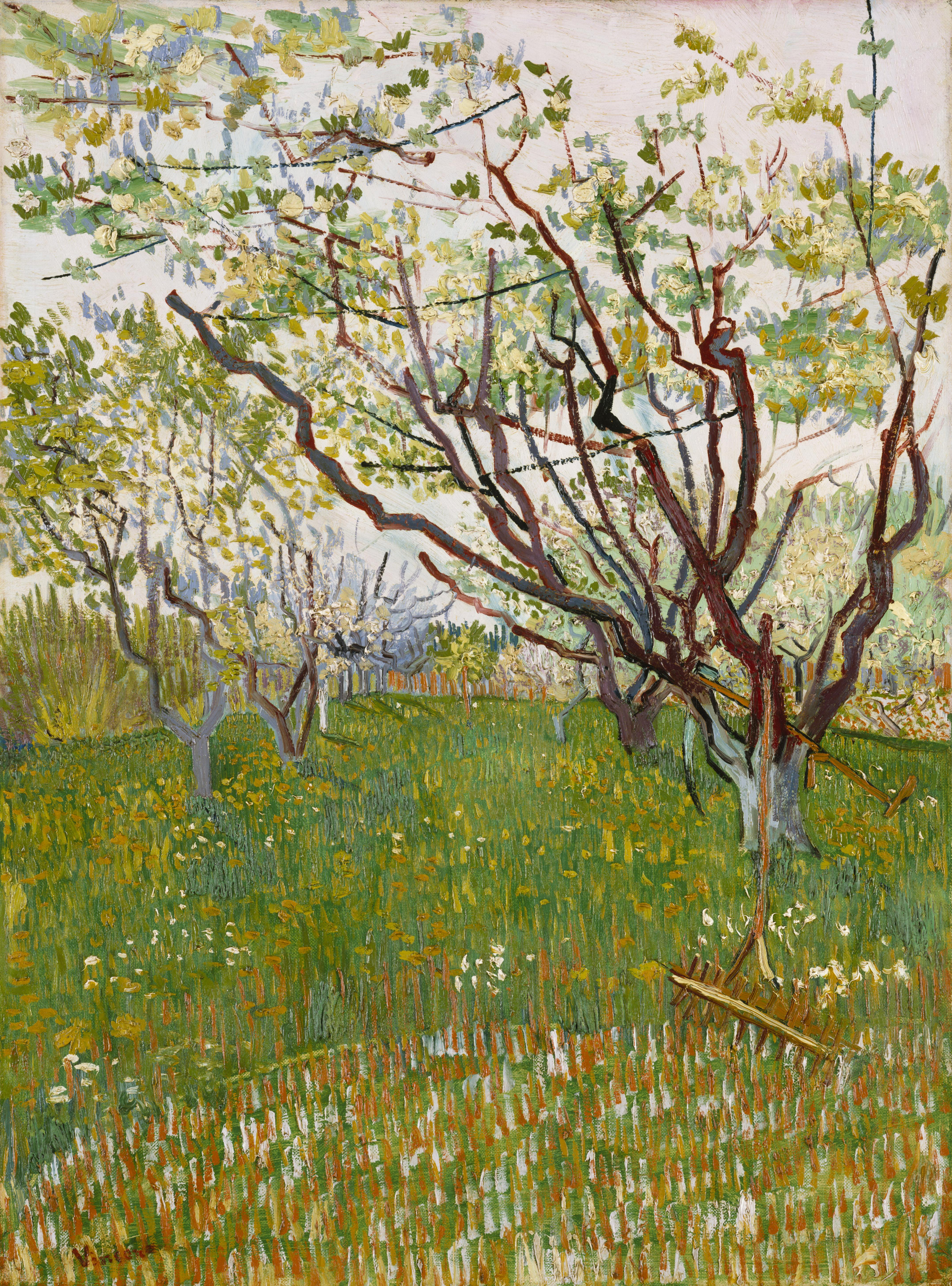
Flowering Orchard
(1888)
Metropolitan Museum of Art, New York (F552)

== See also ==
- List of works by Vincent van Gogh
