= Paul Gauguin's exhibit at Les XX, 1889 =

Paul Gauguin's exhibit at Les XX in 1889 was the first important display of Paul Gauguin's works, and added to the recognition that he had begun to receive in 1888. The annual exhibition was organized by Les XX, and participation was by invitation only. Gauguin's exhibit comprised paintings from Martinique, Brittany and Arles. Many of these can be identified easily, but for several items the discussion is not yet closed.

== Background ==
After Gauguin's return from Martinique at the end of November 1887, he found support in Theo van Gogh, who showed Gauguin's recent work from the Caribics from December 1887. Since then, Gauguin evidently considered Theo van Gogh to be his dealer and promoter, and Gauguin also kept in touch with Theo's brother Vincent. When Gauguin finally accepted the proposition to live and work side to side with Vincent in Arles, he first sent a batch of recent work to Theo in Paris, who exhibited it together with the first batch of paintings sent from Arles, in November 1888. Around this time, Gauguin also received the invitation to exhibit with Les XX in Brussels, in February 1889.

Theo van Gogh had forwarded Octave Maus's invitation to Gauguin when Gauguin was already in Arles. Around the same time Gauguin received news that a collector named Depuis had agreed to purchase Breton Girls in a Ring (provided the artist made a minor modification), that two other of his canvasses had definitely sold, and — perhaps most significantly for Gauguin — that Edgar Degas intended to buy one of his paintings. Gauguin wrote to his friend Emile Schuffenecker with the good news of his invitation from Les XX. Shortly afterwards he received another invitation from Édouard Dujardin of La Revue Indépendante to exhibit in their rooms. Gauguin quickly rejected this invitation due to a review that had appeared in the Revue almost a year earlier; it had been written by Félix Fénéon, and the artist had been described as grièche.

=== Gauguin's shipment from Pont-Aven ===
In the days preceding his depart for Arles, Gauguin probably shipped all of his work executed since his arrival in Pont-Aven to Theo van Gogh in Paris: the recent catalogue raisonné by Daniel Wildenstein lists more than fifty paintings, altogether. Six of these were later included in Gauguin's selection for Les XX, 1889.

=== Gauguin's shipments from Arles ===
November 13, Theo wrote to Gauguin that already two paintings were sold, and a third, la ronde de petites Bretonnes, would need a minor rework to be sold, too. About ten days later, this rework was done, and the painting ready to be shipped back to Paris, together with four paintings recently executed in Arles.

1° Les danseuses
2° un café de nuit
3° Paysage ou les trois grâces au temple de Vènus
4° Les cochons
5° Le vendange ou la pauvresse

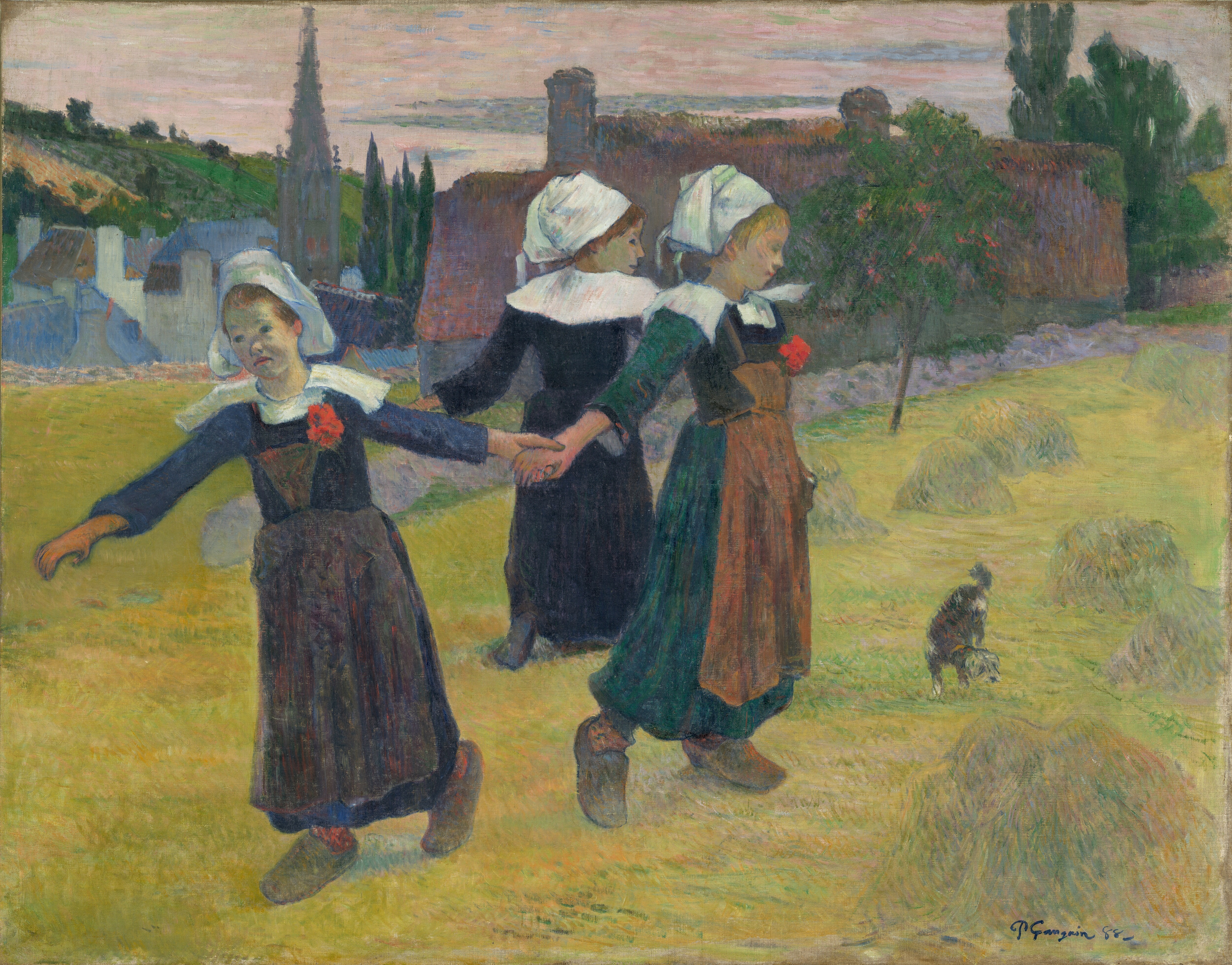
1° Les Danseuses' (1888). National Gallery of Art, Washington

2° un café de nuit' (1888).

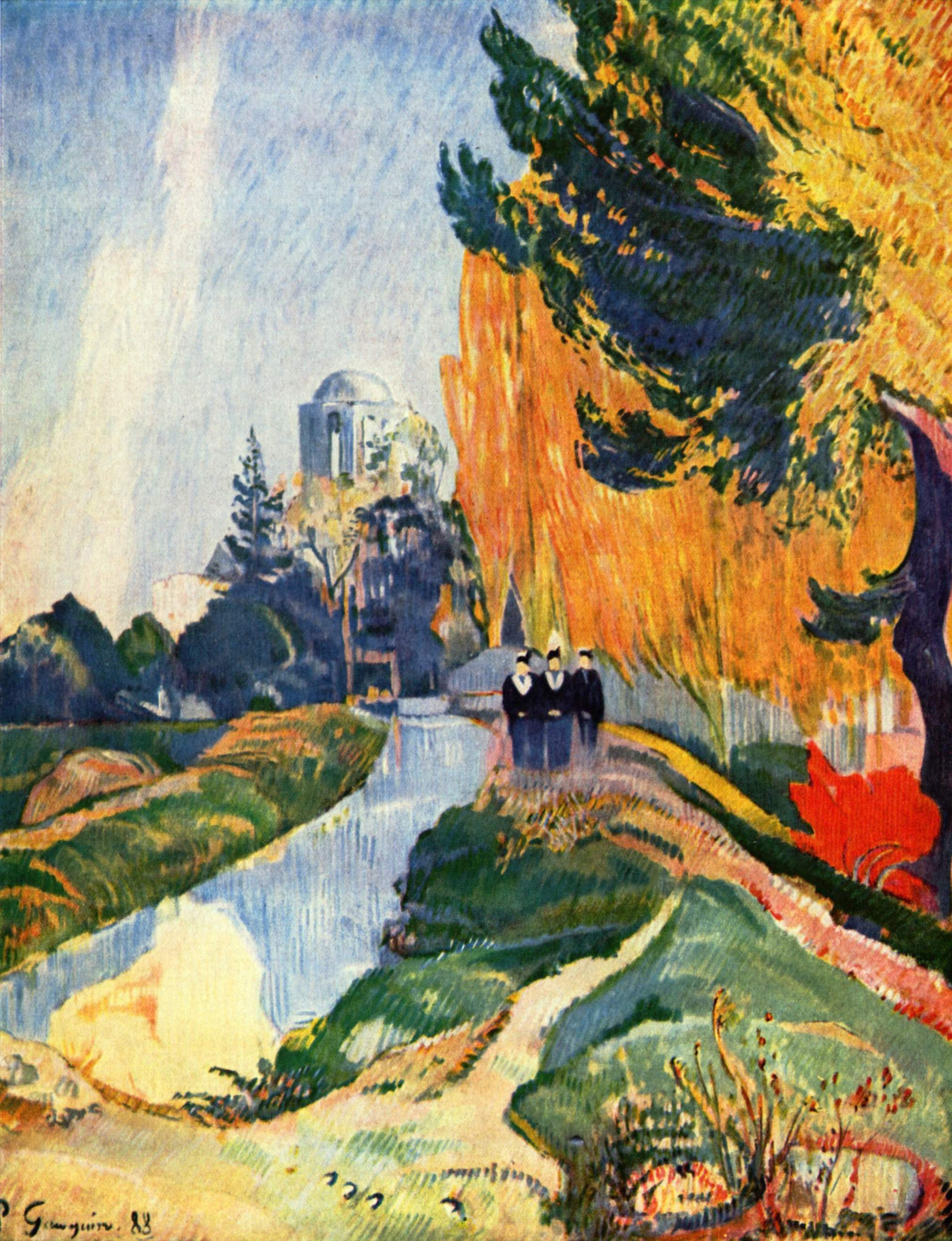
3° Paysage ou les trois grâces au temple de Vénus (1888). Musée d'Orsay, Paris

Gauguin's second and final shipment from Arles coincided with his depart from Arles, end of December 1888. Evidently, he left only some minor studies back in the Yellow House – which he now offered Vincent van Gogh in exchange for the major version of the Sunflowers – and his "masques et gants d'armes". Vincent refused categorically. By this time, his brother had already acquired Gauguin's portrait of Vincent, The Painter of Sunflowers.

== Gauguin's selection ==
Gauguin's selection
Image	Les XX 1889 catalogue entry	Notebook entry	Location
	1. Aux Mangos (Tropiques).	1 mangos Vangog (!)	Van Gogh Museum, Amsterdam
	2. Conversation (Tropiques).	2 tropiques 600	
	3. Paysage Breton.	3 Paysage Breton 2 femmes 500	Private collection
	4. Breton et veau.	4 Breton et veau hiver 500	Ny Carlsberg Glyptotek, Copenhagen
	5. Berger et bergère.	5 berger et bergère. 2 vo. 500	Royal Museums of Fine Arts of Belgium, Brussels
	6. Lutteurs en herbe.	6 Lutteurs 500 (or 800)	Private collection
	7. Vision du sermon.	7 vision du Sermon 1000	National Gallery of Scotland, Edinburgh
	8. En pleine chaleur.	8 En pleine chaleur 1000	Private collection
	9. Misères humaines.	9 Misères humaines 1500	Ordrupgaard, Charlottenlund
	10. Au presbytère.	10 Au presbytere (87) 500 (!)	
	11. Le mas.	11 Les mas. 500 (!)	
	12. "Vous y passerez, la belle!" (!)	12 Vous y passerez la belle 500 (!)	Ordrupgaard, Charlottenlund

The dispute on identification of the items included continues.

=== See also ===
- Vincent van Gogh's display at Les XX, 1890

== Resources ==
=== References ===
- Delevoy, Robert L. (ed.): Les XX, Bruxelles. Catalogue des dix expositions annuelles, Reprint: Centre International pour l'Etude de XIXe Siècle, Brussels 1981 (no ISBN)
- Roskill, Mark: Van Gogh, Gauguin and French Painting of the 1880s: A Catalogue raisonné of Key Works, University Microfilms, Ann Arbor 1970
- Wildenstein, Daniel (ed.): Gauguin. A Savage in the Making. Catalogue Raisonné of the Paintings (1873–1888), Skira editore, Milan & Wildenstein Institute, Paris 2002 ISBN 88-8491-137-0
