= The Red Vineyard =

1888 painting by Vincent van Gogh

The Red Vineyards near Arles
- Artist: Vincent van Gogh
- Year: 1888
- Catalogue: F495; JH1626
- Medium: Oil on canvas
- Dimensions: 75 cm × 93 cm (29.5 in × 36.6 in)
- Location: Pushkin State Museum of Fine Arts, Moscow

The Red Vineyards near Arles is an oil painting by the Dutch painter Vincent van Gogh, executed on a privately primed Toile de 30 piece of burlap in early November 1888. It depicts workers in a vineyard, and it is the only painting known by name that van Gogh sold in his lifetime.

== History ==
The Red Vineyard was exhibited for the first time at the annual exhibition of Les XX, 1890, in Brussels, and sold for 400 francs (US$2,100 in 2025) to Belgian painter and collector Anna Boch, a member of Les XX. Anna was the sister of Eugène Boch, another impressionist painter and a friend of Van Gogh, whose portrait van Gogh painted (Le Peintre aux Étoiles) in Arles in autumn 1888. In a later letter to his brother Theo discussing the sale, van Gogh admitted with some embarrassment that the Bochs paid the Les XX 1890 Exhibition sticker price, when in fact they probably should have gotten a "friend's price".

The painting was later purchased, in 1909, from a Paris art gallery by Ivan Morozov. After the Russian Revolution, the painting was subsequently nationalised by the Bolsheviks and was eventually passed to Moscow's Pushkin State Museum of Fine Arts.

== See also ==
- List of works by Vincent van Gogh

== Sources ==
- Hulsker, Jan. The Complete Van Gogh. Oxford: Phaidon, 1980. ISBN 0-7148-2028-8.
- Pickvance, Ronald. Van Gogh in Arles (exh. cat. Metropolitan Museum of Art, New York), Abrams, New York 1984. ISBN 0-87099-375-5.
