= View of Arles, Flowering Orchards =

Painting by Vincent van Gogh

View of Arles, flowering orchards
- Vue d'Arles, vergers en fleurs (French), Blick auf Arles, blühende obstgärten (German)
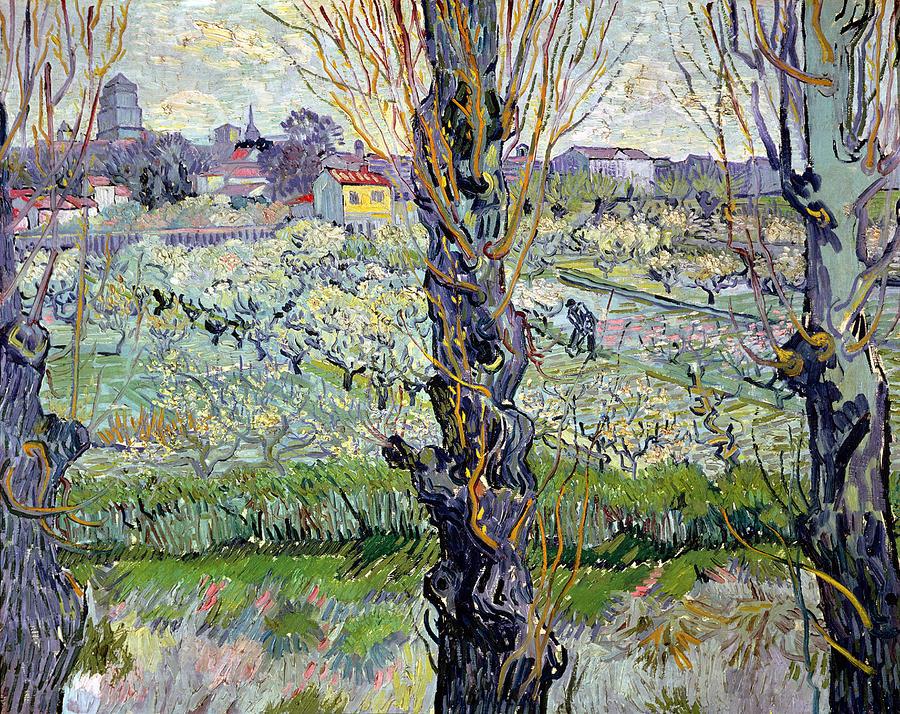
- Artist: Vincent van Gogh
- Year: 1889
- Catalogue: F516; JH1685
- Medium: oil on canvas
- Movement: Post Impressionism
- Dimensions: 72 cm × 92 cm (28.3 in × 36.2 in)
- Location: Neue Pinakothek; Munich

View of Arles, Flowering Orchards is a painting by Vincent van Gogh, executed in spring 1889, one of several paintings he produced in his Flowering Orchards series while living in Arles.

== Description ==
It supplies a view across a canal and the poplars on its board towards the historical center of Arles, with the towers of Saint-Trophime and College St Charles to the left, contrasted by recent building of the Caserne Calvin, housing the Zouave Regiment, to the right.

Van Gogh was acquainted with several of the Zouave officers, painted one in native uniform, and his portrait of Lieutenant Milliet is known as The Lover.

Poplar trees still stand along the canal, today, but the orchards and the Caserne are gone.

== Displays ==
Van Gogh incorporated this painting in his selection of works to be displayed at Les XX, in Bruxelles 1890.

== See also ==
- List of works by Vincent van Gogh
