= Vincent van Gogh's display at Les XX, 1890 =

Exhibition of works by Vincent van Gogh

Vincent Van Gogh was displayed at the 1890 Les XX exhibition—an invitation-only show exclusively for members—in Brussels, Belgium. This served to demonstrate the recognition Van Gogh received from his avant-garde peers during his life. The choices of his works and their arrangements illustrated his thinking about his years of work in Provence.

His argument for their importance was rejected, and was washed away by the scandal his works provoked. The same works were again shown at the annual exhibition of the Artistes Indépendants in Paris which offered space for an expansion of the display. This was done by Theo van Gogh, Vincent's brother, as Vincent was suffering from long-lasting mental problems.

Ivy, the centerpiece of Van Gogh's arrangement, has been lost without trace since World War II. Hermann Göring is the last person photographed (by Hans Hoffmann) with this canvas while it was stored, together with other works of art confiscated from French Jewish collections, in the Jeu de Paume Galleries.

== Preparation ==
In a letter dated November 15, 1889, Les XX organizer Octave Maus invited van Gogh to exhibit at the January 1890 show. Van Gogh accepted in a letter dated November 20, 1889, that listed the six paintings, all size 30 canvases, to be displayed:

1. Tournesols (Sunflowers)
2. Tournesols (Sunflowers)
3. Le lierre (Ivy)
4. Verger en fleurs (Arles) - Flowering Orchard (Arles)
5. Champ de blé; soleil levant (Saint-Remy) - Wheat Field, Sunrise (Saint-Rémy)
6. La Vigne rouge (Mont-Major) - Red Vineyard (Mont-Majour)

This was not the display order or arrangement that Van Gogh desired. No definitive documentation of his intentions or the actual display is known to survive. But on the back of Maus' letter, there is a pencil sketch that gives some hints for the display Van Gogh proposed and for its artistic background. Other hints can be compiled from other parts of Van Gogh's correspondence. In various letters, Van Gogh indicated that his two Sunflowers were to be displayed on either side of Ivy. To the left and right of this upright triptych, he wanted to place the Flowering Orchard and the Wheat Field at Sunrise. Finally, van Gogh indicated Red Vineyard was to be hung (at the top or) underneath this arrangement.

There is now agreement that Van Gogh's exhibit can be reconstructed in the order of paintings below:

Flowering Orchard (Arles, Spring 1889). Neue Pinakothek, Munich, Germany.	Sunflowers (Arles, August 1888). National Gallery, London, United Kingdom.	Ivy (Saint-Rémy 1889). Present whereabouts unknown.	Sunflowers (Arles, August 1888). Neue Pinakothek, Munich, Germany.	Wheat Field, Sunrise (Saint-Rémy, 1889). Private collection.
Red Vineyard (Mont-Majour) (Arles, November 1888). Pushkin Museum of Fine Arts

=== "Impressions of Provence" ===
The four landscapes depict traditional notions of the four seasons: flowering trees in spring, a shaded hiding place in the midst of ivy in summer, the vineyard harvest in autumn, and new wheat on the furrows in winter. In between the seasons were embedded the heraldic flowers of Provence: sunflowers, dear to the artistic and literary circles of the Félibres, the néo-provencal movement around Frédéric Mistral.

These seasonal links are set not only in subject matter, but — and from Van Gogh's point of view even more important — reinforced by the choice of colour. Each of the six paintings is dominated by one of the six primary colours (yellow, red, blue, and their complementaries orange, green, and violet). He uses yellow and orange in the two Sunflowers-versions, red in the vineyard, green in the ivy, blue in the orchard, and violet in the field. Thus, the full colour spectrum is manifested in this selection, which can consequently be read as a single entity, "a whole" (French: un tout).

Earlier in 1889, Van Gogh had already expressed his wish before returning to the North to summarise his "impressions of Provence".

== Exhibition ==
Red Vineyard (Mont-Majour) (Arles, November 1888). Sold to Anna Boch

The exhibition of Les XX opened January 18, running till February 23. Two days before the opening, Henry de Groux announced that his works would not be seen side by side with the "abominable Pot of Sunflowers by Monsieur Vincent or any other agent provocateur". At the opening dinner, De Groux once again attacked Van Gogh's paintings and called him:

"an ignoramus and a charlatan. At the other end of the table Lautrec suddenly bounced up, with his arms in the air, and shouted that it was an outrage to criticize so great an artist. De Groux retorted. Tumult. Seconds were appointed. Signac announced coldly that if Lautrec were killed he would assume the quarrel himself."

That same evening, Les XX expelled De Groux from their association; the next day he apologised and was allowed to resign. Thus the duel was averted, and Paul Signac was soon one of two supplementary members elected to Les XX.

One work of Van Gogh's exhibit was sold, The Red Vineyard. The buyer was Anna Boch, a painter and member of Les XX since its foundation and sister of Eugène Boch, who was also a painter and a friend of Vincent van Gogh.

== Altered exhibit at the Artistes Indépendants ==
The Artistes Indépendants, collaborating closely with Les XX in Brussels, were eager to present Van Gogh to the public in Paris in an even broader scale, and finally showed ten paintings in their 6th annual exhibition, March 20 through April 27, 1890:

832. Le cyprès. - The Cypres
833. Paysage montagneux en Provence. - Mountain landscape in Provence
834. Rue à Saint-Rémy. - Street in Saint-Rémy
835. Les Alpines. (!) - The Alpilles
836. Promenade à Arles. - Promenade in Arles
837. Mûrier en automne. - Mulberry tree in autumn
838. Sous-bois. - Underwoods
839. Lever de soleil en Provence. - Sunrise in Provence
840. Les Tournesols. - The Sunflowers
841. Verger d'oliviers en Provence. - Olive orchard in Provence

Evidently, the first part of Van Gogh's exhibit (832. - 837.) was now chosen by Theo, while the remainders from Brussels were added (838. - 841.) at the end of this selection, excluding one version of the Sunflowers (and The Red Vineyard sold in Brussels).

Again, Van Gogh exhibit was the clou of the show: Gauguin, Guillaumin and other colleagues proposed to exchange works; Duez sent his compliments; and Theo wrote to Vincent on April 23 that Monet had said, "your pictures were the best of all in the exhibition".

Some of Van Gogh's paintings in the Artistes Indépendants show

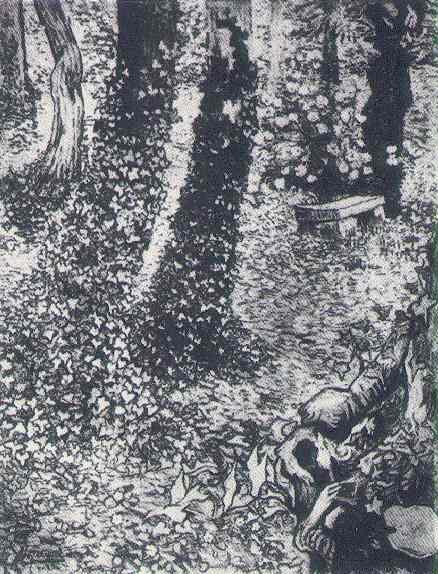
838. Underwoods. Present whereabouts unknown.

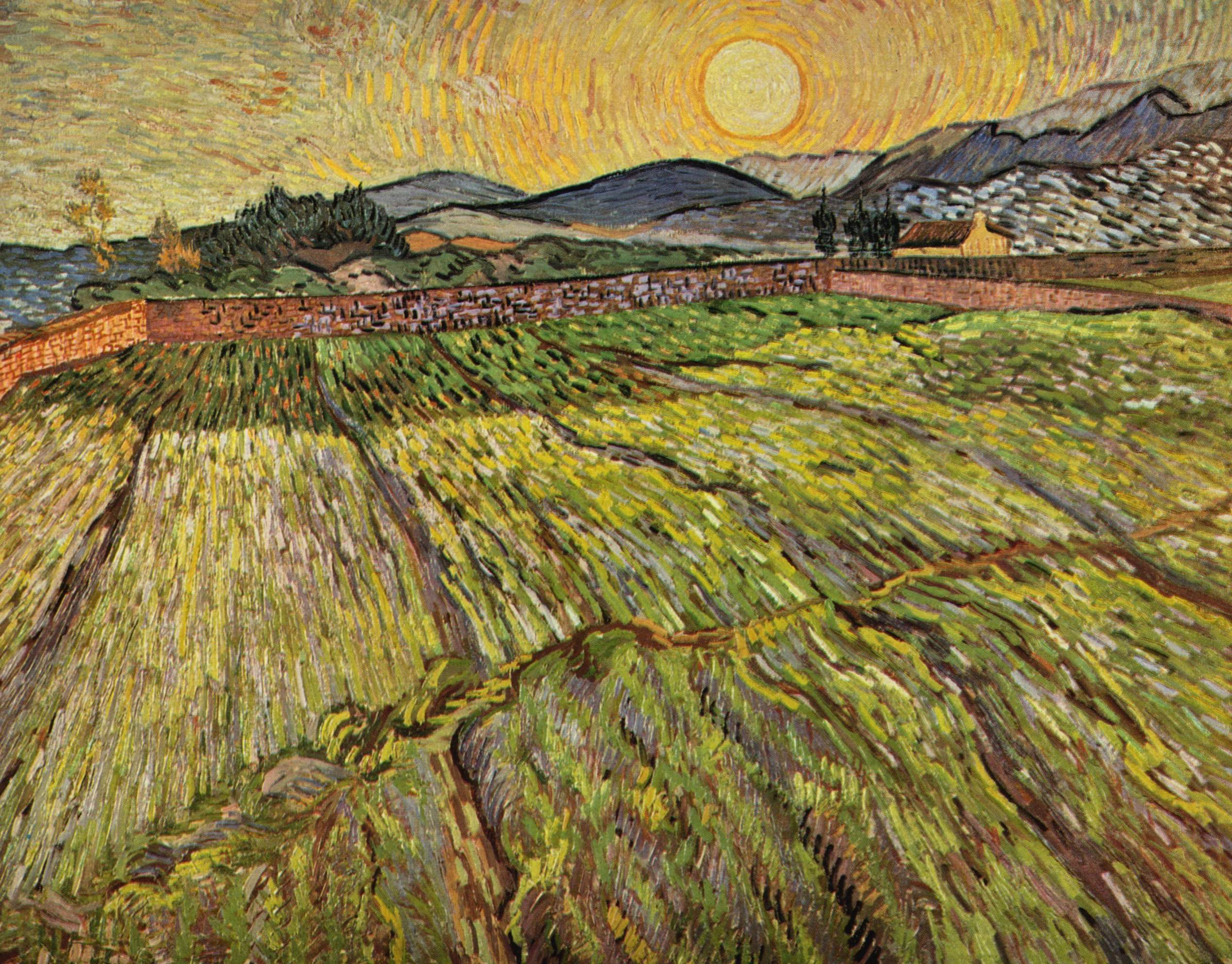
839. Lever de soleil en Provence. Present whereabouts unknown.

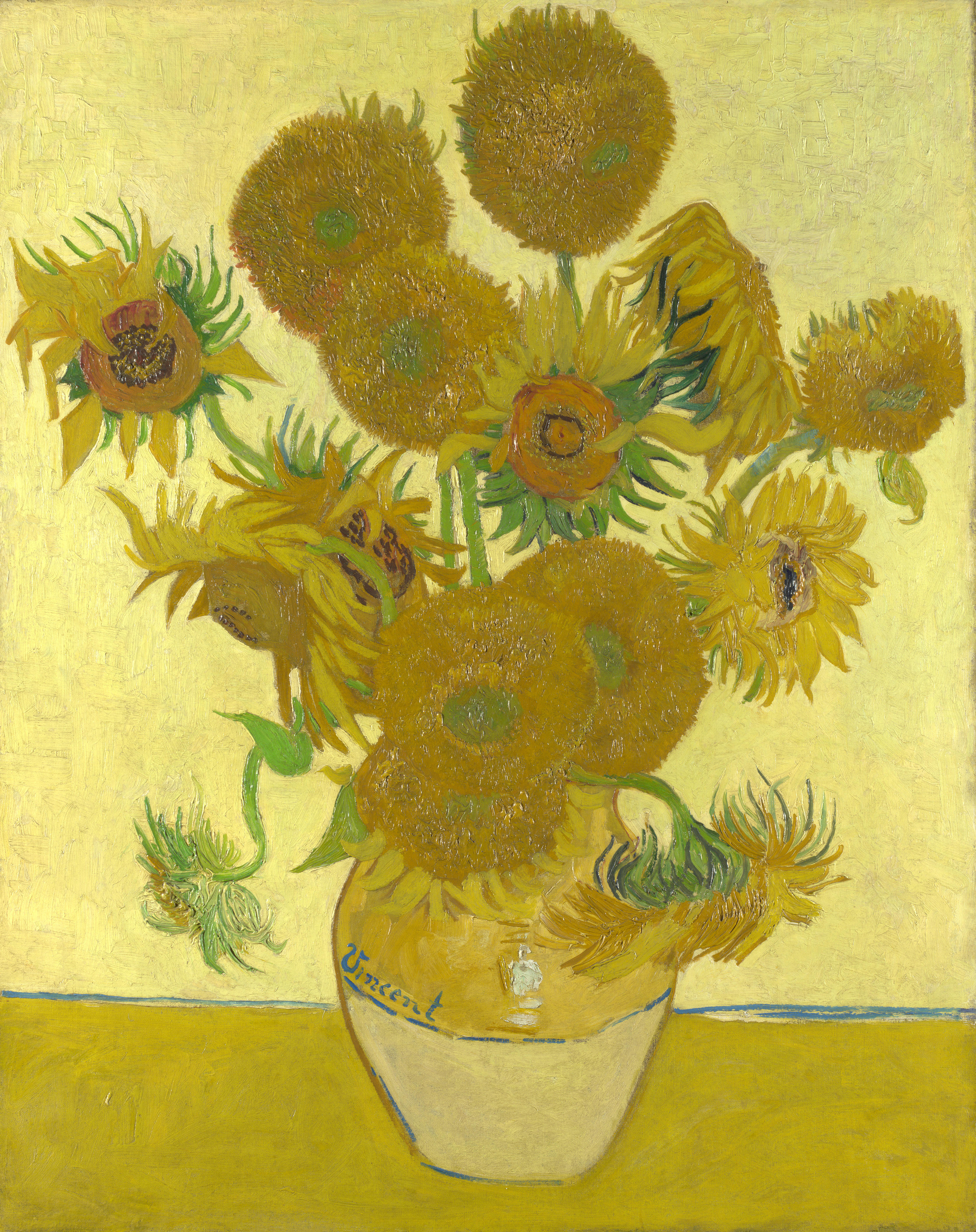
840. Sunflowers (Arles, August 1888). National Gallery, London, United Kingdom.

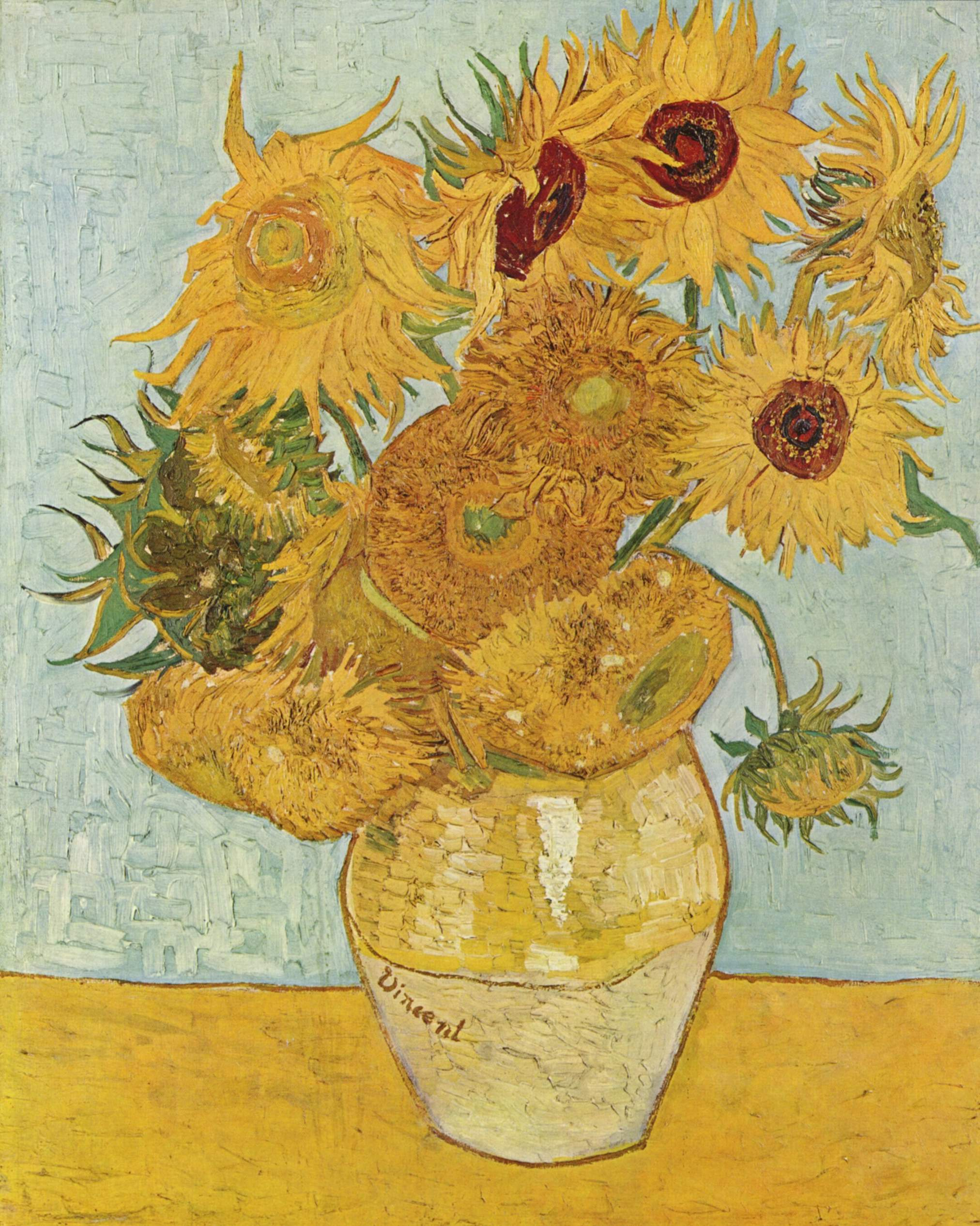
840. Sunflowers (Arles, August 1888). Neue Pinakothek, Munich, Germany.

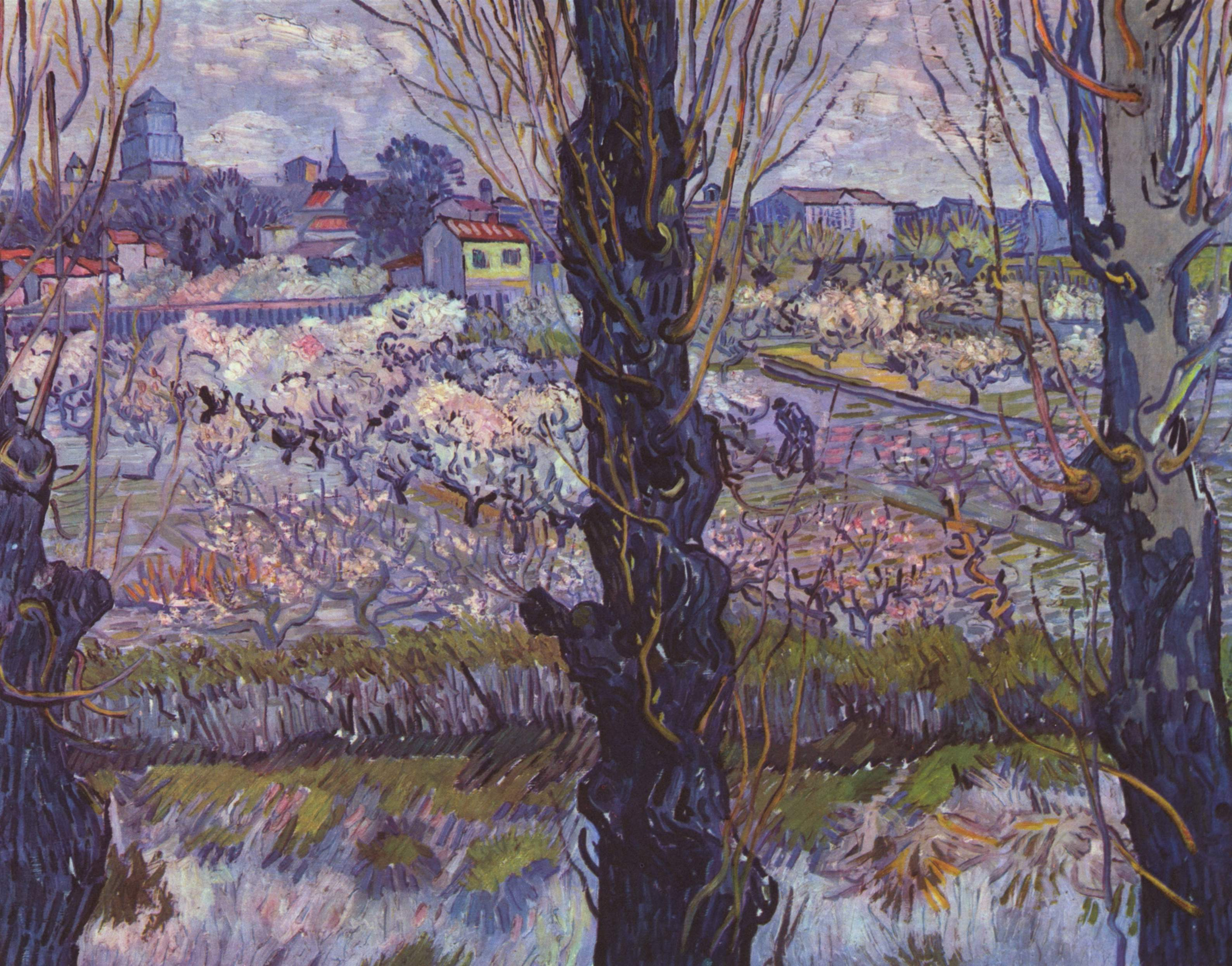
841. Verger d'oliviers en Provence. Neue Pinakothek, Munich, Germany.

== See also ==
- Paul Gauguin's exhibit at Les XX, 1889
- List of works by Vincent van Gogh

== Resources ==
=== References ===
- Dorn, Roland: Vincent van Gogh's Concept of "Décoration", Vincent van Gogh International Symposium, Tokyo, October 17, 18, 19, 1985, Tokyo 1988, pp. 375–403 (in English and Japanese)
- Octave Maus, Madeleine: Trente années de l'lutte pour l'art, Librairie L'Oiseau bleau, Bruxelles 1926; reprinted by Éditions Lebeer Hossmann, Bruxelles 1980
- Rewald, John: Post-Impressionism: From van Gogh to Gauguin, revised edition, Secker & Warburg, London 1978, pp. 346–347
