= Anna Boch =

Belgian painter

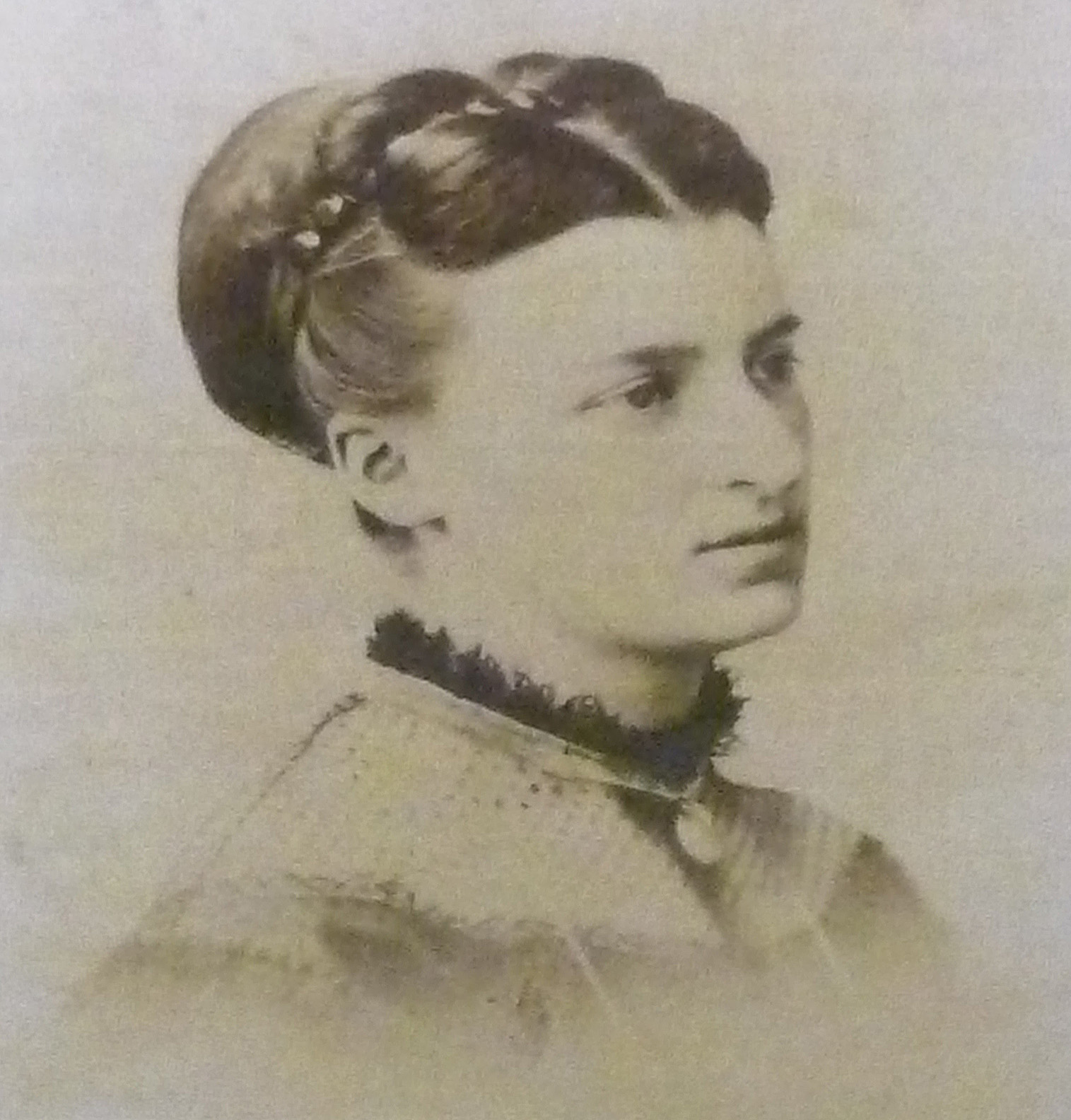
- Portrait photo of Anna Boch (before 1900)
- Born: 10 February 1848; Saint-Vaast, Belgium
- Died: 25 February 1936 (aged 88); Ixelles, Belgium
- Known for: Painting
- Movement: Pointillism, Impressionism

Anna-Rosalie Boch (10 February 1848 – 25 February 1936), known as Anna, was a Belgian painter, art collector, and the only female member of the artistic group, Les XX.

Boch's family was involved in art in different ways. Her father, Frédéric Victor Boch, was a successful manufacturer of porcelain; her brother, Eugène Boch, was a painter, and her cousin, Octave Maus, was an art critic.

== Artistic style ==
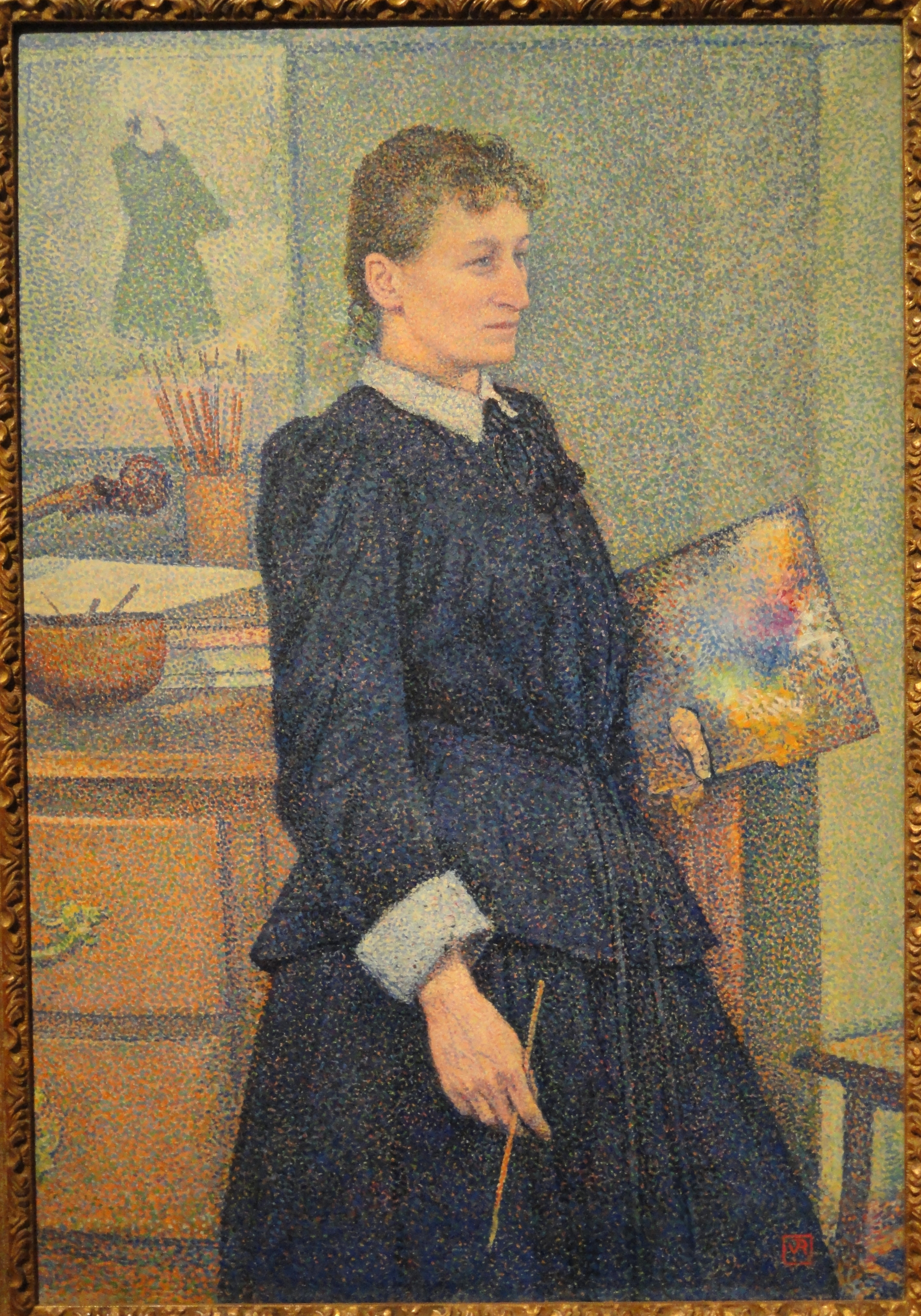
Anna Boch, c. 1889, by Théo van Rysselberghe

Boch participated in the Neo-Impressionist movement. Her early works used a Pointillist technique, but she is best known for her Impressionist style which she adopted for most of her career. A pupil of Isidore Verheyden, she was influenced by Théo van Rysselberghe whom she met in the artistic group, Les XX.

== Collecting ==
Boch actively collected works of art by her contemporaries. She assembled a major collection of Post-Impressionist paintings, which included works by Paul Gauguin, Paul Signac, James Ensor, and Vincent van Gogh. She promoted many young artists, including Van Gogh, whom she admired for his talent and who was a friend of her brother Eugène Boch. La Vigne Rouge (The Red Vineyard), purchased by Anna Boch, is believed to be the only painting Van Gogh sold during his lifetime. The Anna Boch collection was sold after her death. In her will, she donated the money to pay for the retirement of poor artist friends.

== Legacy ==
The Red Vineyard, by Vincent van Gogh, (1888) bought from him by Anna Boch

140 of her own paintings were left to her godchild, Ida van Haelewijn, the daughter of her gardener. Many of these paintings show Ida van Haelewijn as a little girl in the garden. In 1968, these 140 paintings were purchased by her great nephew Luitwin von Boch, the CEO of Villeroy & Boch Ceramics. The paintings remained in the house of Ida van Haelewijn until her death in 1992. The Anna & Eugène Boch Expo opened 30 March 2011.

Some paintings were also donated by Anna Boch's estate to various museums like the Royal Museums of Fine Arts of Belgium.

Exhibitions about her life and work have been held at the Royal Museum of Mariemont at Morlanwelz, between October at December 2000, at the Vincent van Gogh-huis in Hoogeveen in 2010 and at the Mu.ZEE in Ostend in 2023.

In 2025, some of Boch's paintings were included in the 'Radical Harmony: Helene Kröller-Müller's Neo-Impressionists' exhibition at the National Gallery, London.

== Cultural heritage ==
In 2005, the Belgian historian Dr Therèse Thomas published a catalogue raisonné.

== Gallery ==
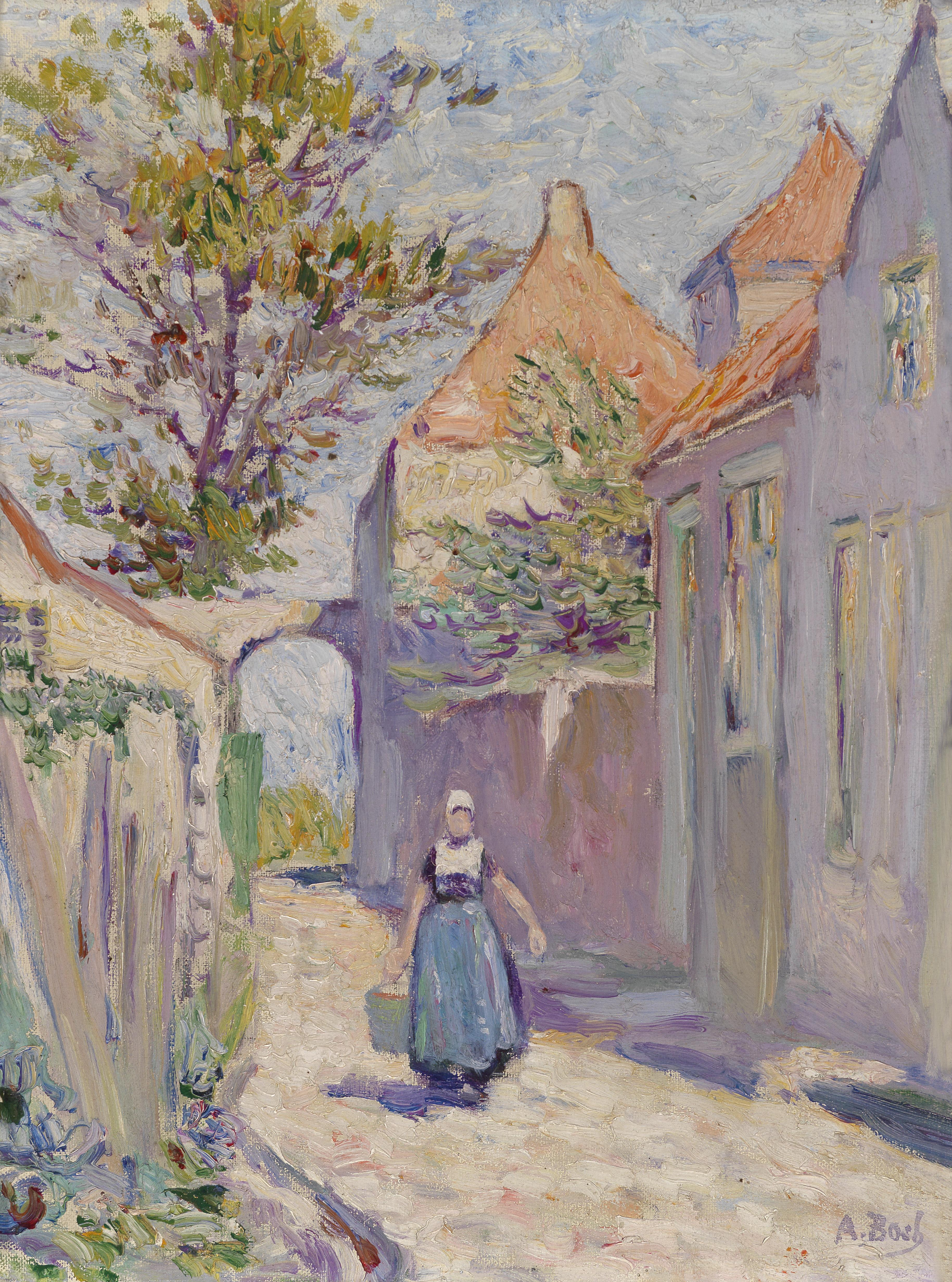
Die Wasserträgerin, 33 x 25 cm.

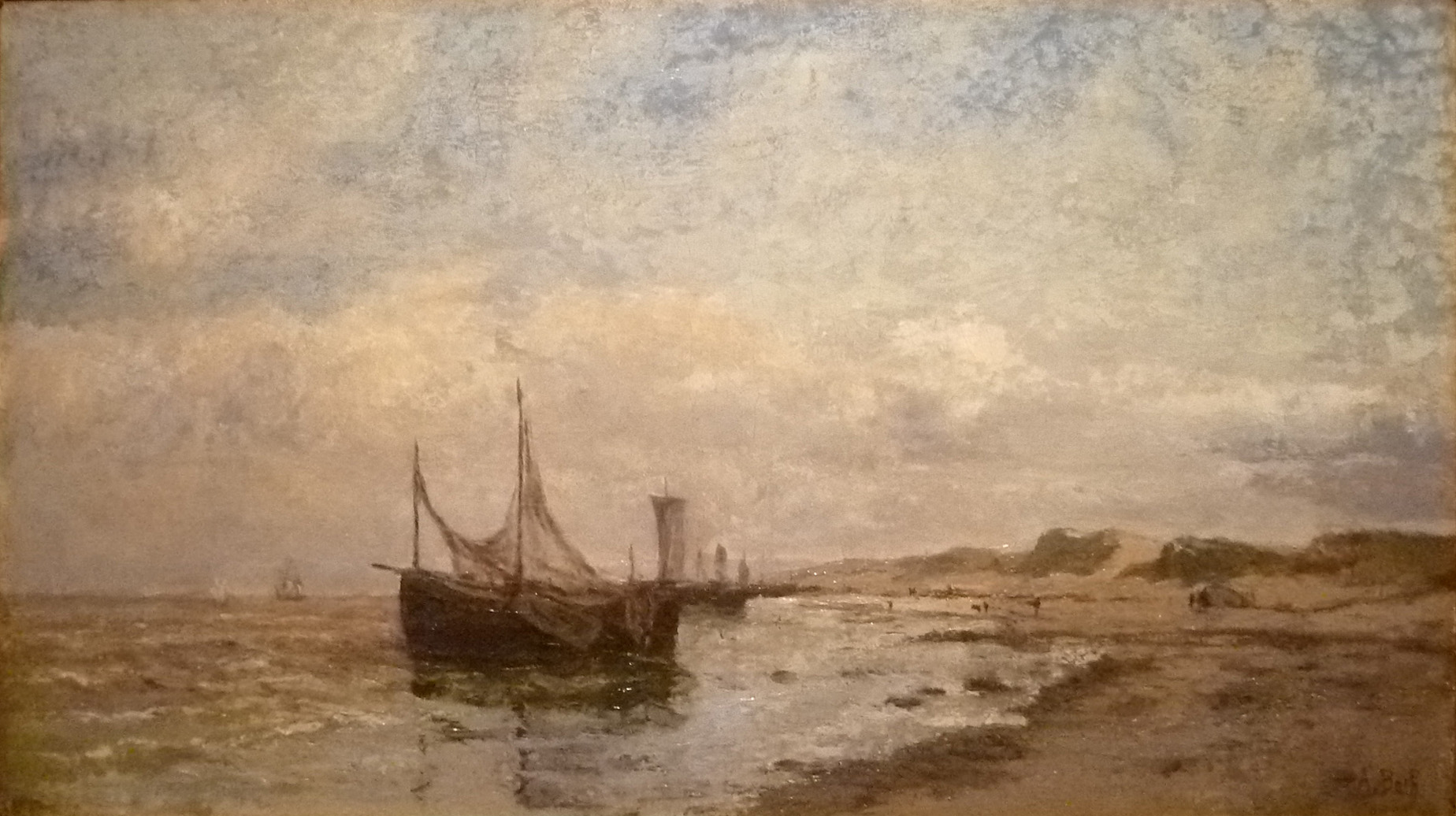
Sur la côte de la Mer du Nord, (1887) 53 x 91 cm.

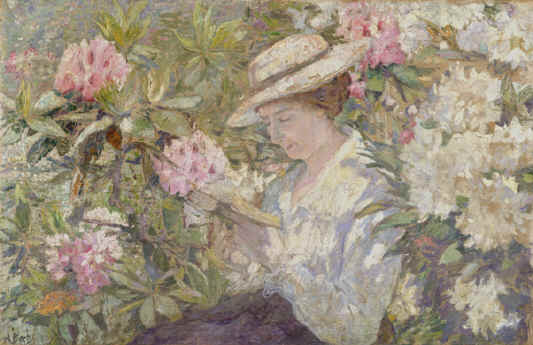
Femme lisant dans un massif de rhododendrons, (around 1900) 67 x 106 cm.

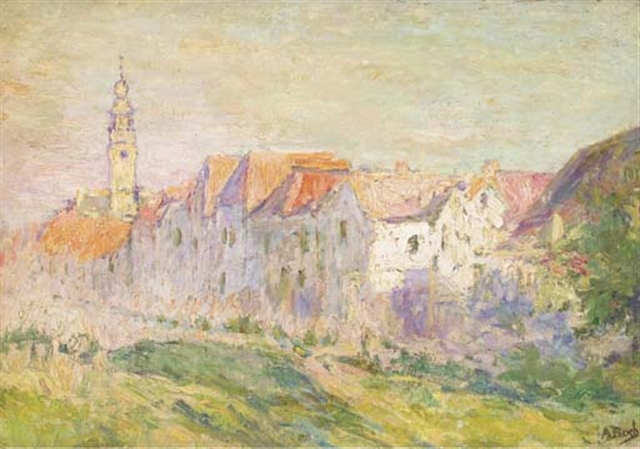
Vue de Veere, Zélande, (around 1906) 38,5 x 53,5 cm.

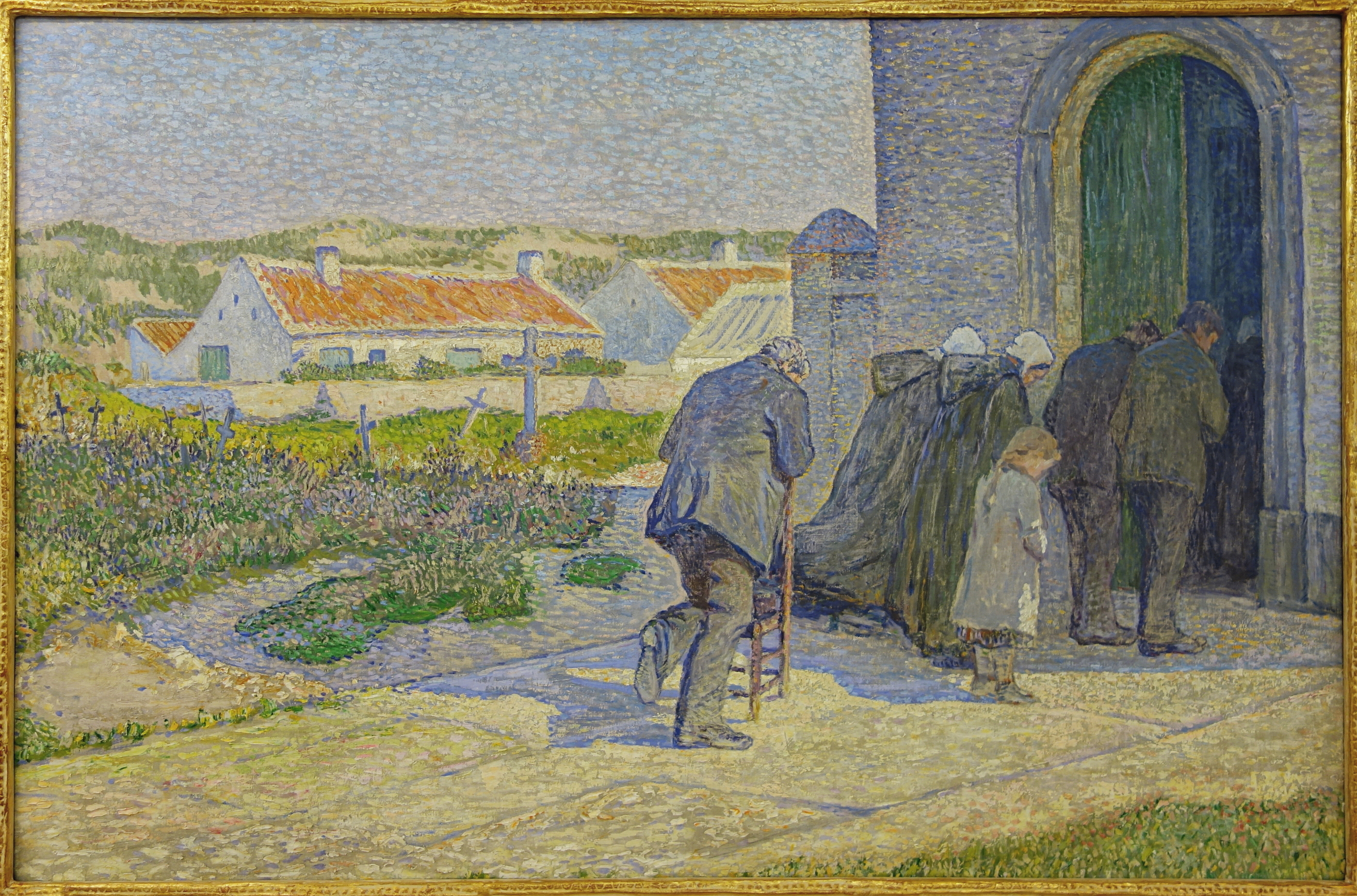
Pendant l'élévation, (1879) 74.5 x 113 cm.

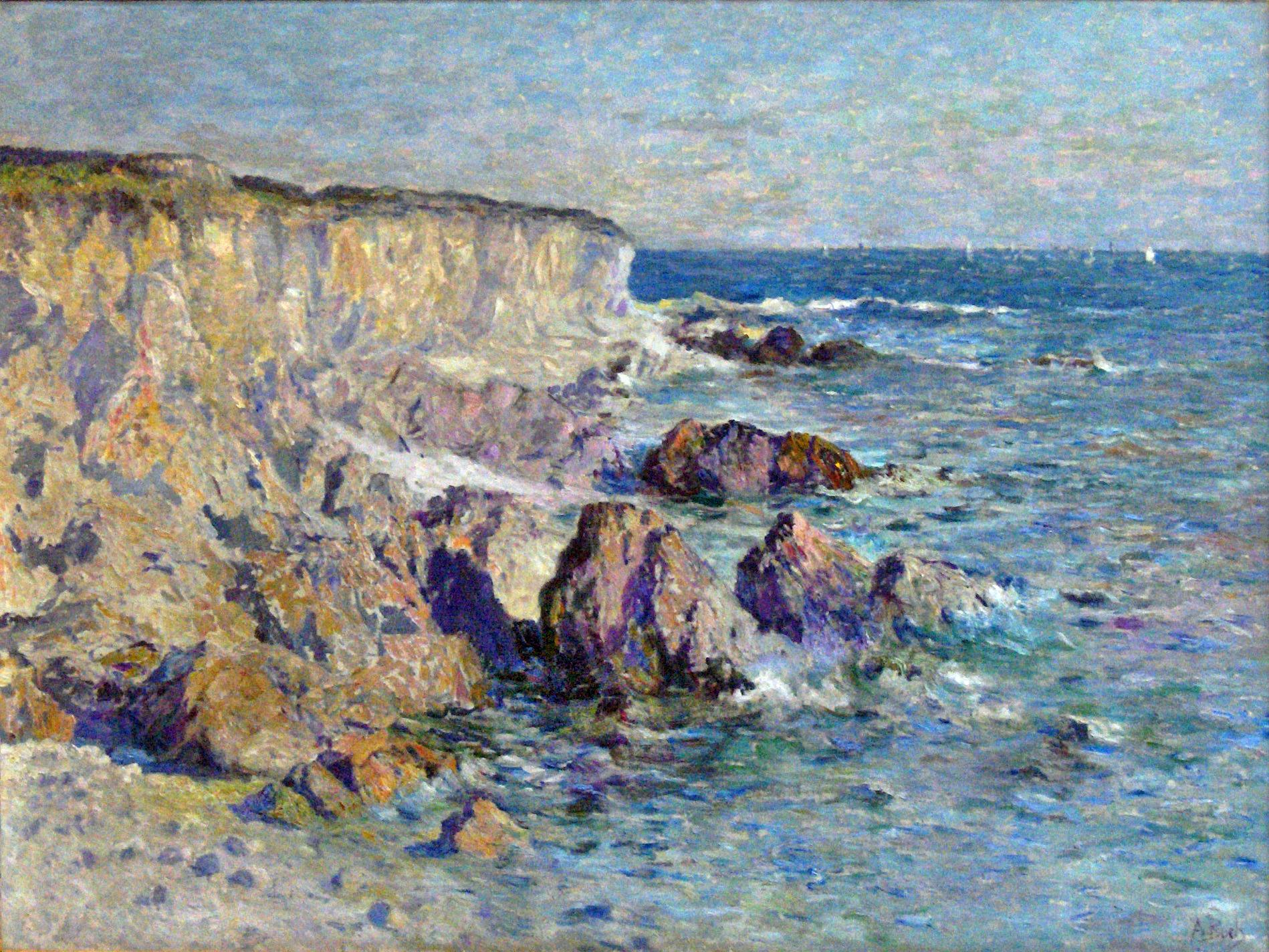
Rivages de Bretagne, (around 1901)

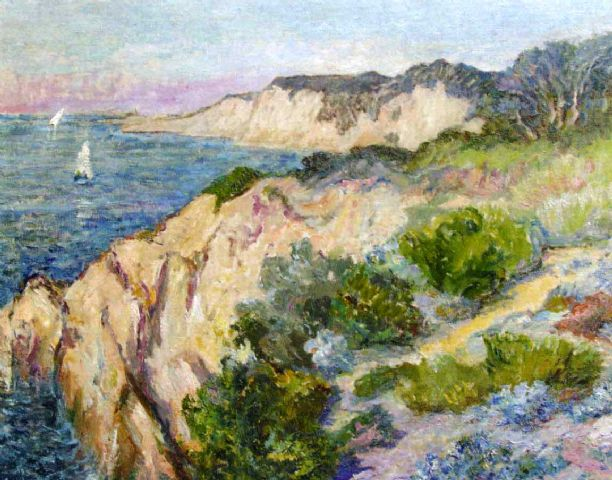
Falaise - Côte de Bretagne, 62 x 84 cm.

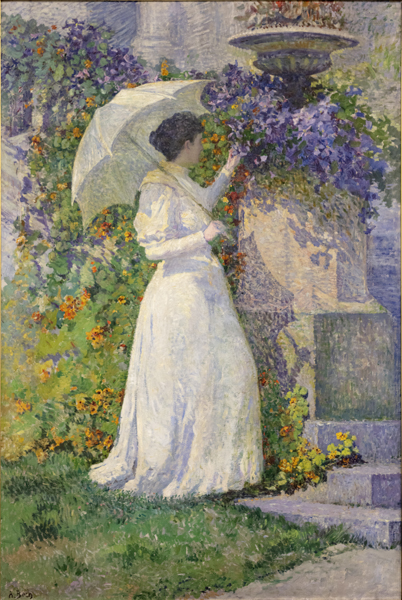
En Juin, (1894)

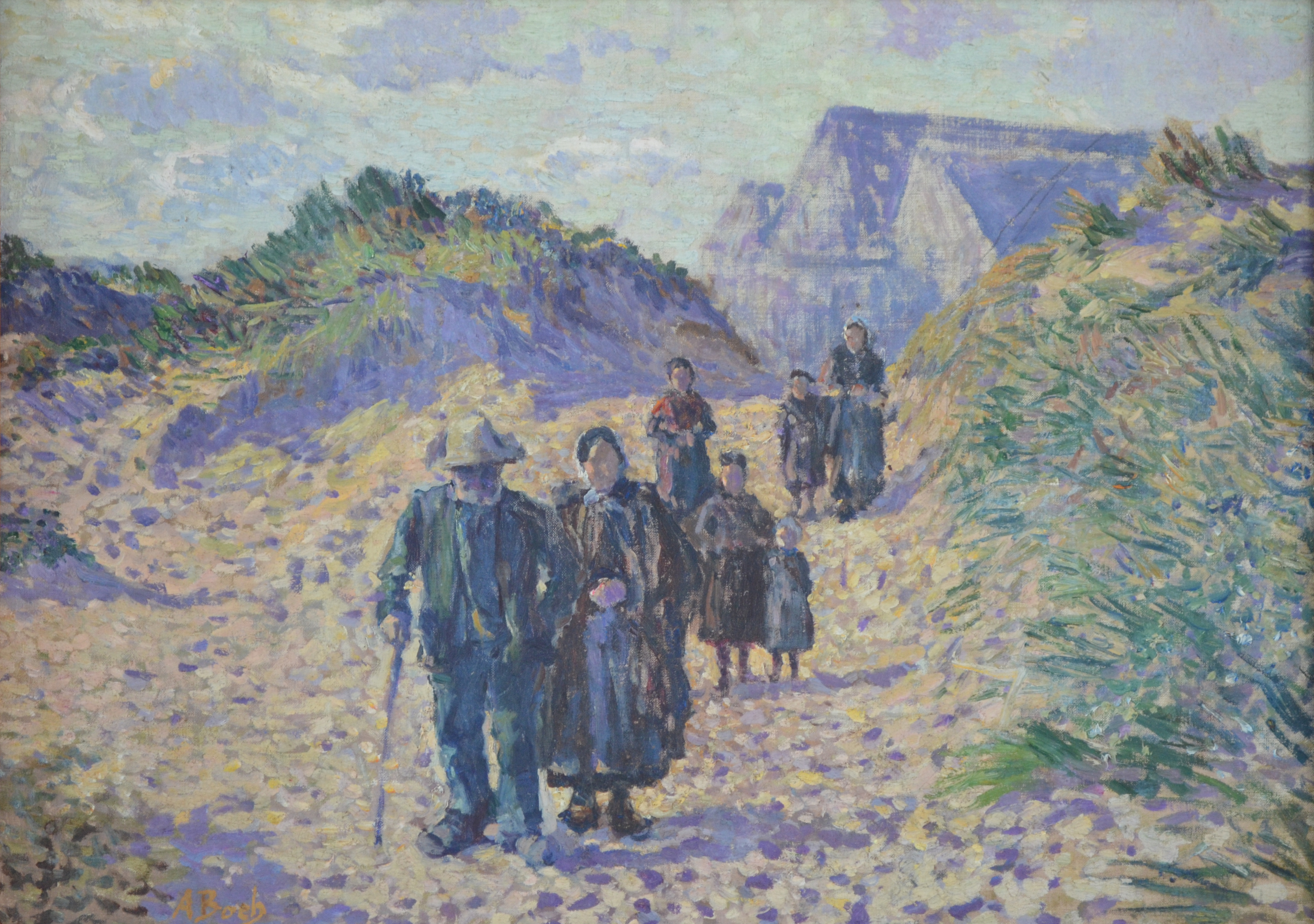
Retour de la messe par les dunes.

== Sources ==
- P. & V. Berko, Dictionary of Belgian painters born between 1750 & 1875, Knokke 1981, p. 51.
