= Vincent van Gogh chronology =

Self-Portrait, August 1889, Oil on canvas, National Gallery of Art, Washington, D.C. (F626, JH1770)

This is a chronology of the artist Vincent van Gogh. It is based as far as possible on Van Gogh's correspondence. However, it has only been possible to construct the chronology by drawing on additional sources. Most of his letters are not dated and it was only in 1973 that a sufficient dating was established by Jan Hulsker, subsequently revised by Ronald Pickvance and marginally corrected by others. Many other relevant dates in the chronology derive from the biographies of his brother Theo, his uncle and godfather Cent, his friends Émile Bernard and Paul Gauguin, and others.

Facts and dates which are undisputed (see Resources), remain unreferenced.

Contents:

1850 1851 1852 1853 1855 1857 1859
1861 1862 1864 1866 1867 1868 1869
1870 1871 1872 1873 1874 1875 1876 1877 1878 1879
1880 1881 1882 1883 1884 1885 1886 1887 1888 1889
1890 1891

Footnotes
References
External links

== 1850 ==
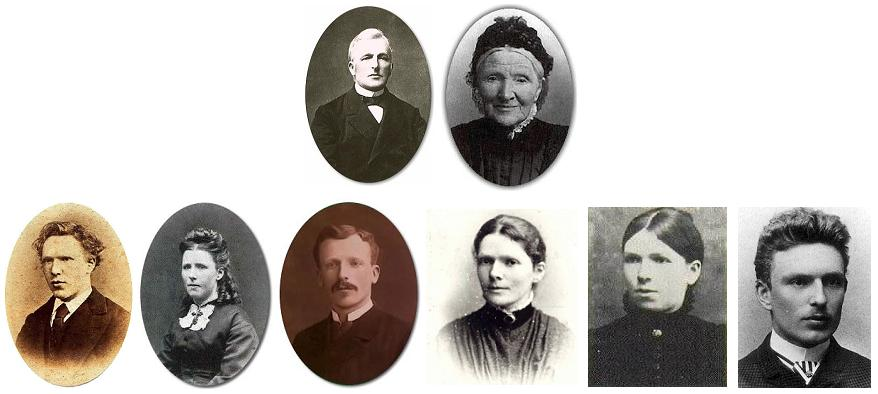
The Van Gogh family: On top Theodorus van Gogh (1822–1885) and Anna Cornelia van Gogh-Carbentus (1819–1907), below left to right Vincent Willem (1853–1890), Anna Cornelia (1855–1930), Theo (1857–1891), Elisabetha Huberta (1859–1936), Willemina Jacoba (1862–1941) and Cornelis Vincent (1867–1900)

- November 6: Vincent van Gogh (Uncle Cent) marries Cornelia Carbentus, in The Hague.

== 1851 ==
- May 21: Ds. Theodorus van Gogh, since 1849 pastor in Groot-Zundert, marries Anna Cornelia Carbentus, his brother Cent's sister-in-law, in The Hague.

== 1852 ==
- March 30: Theodorus and Anna Cornelia have their first child, a son, called Vincent; dies at birth.

== 1853 ==
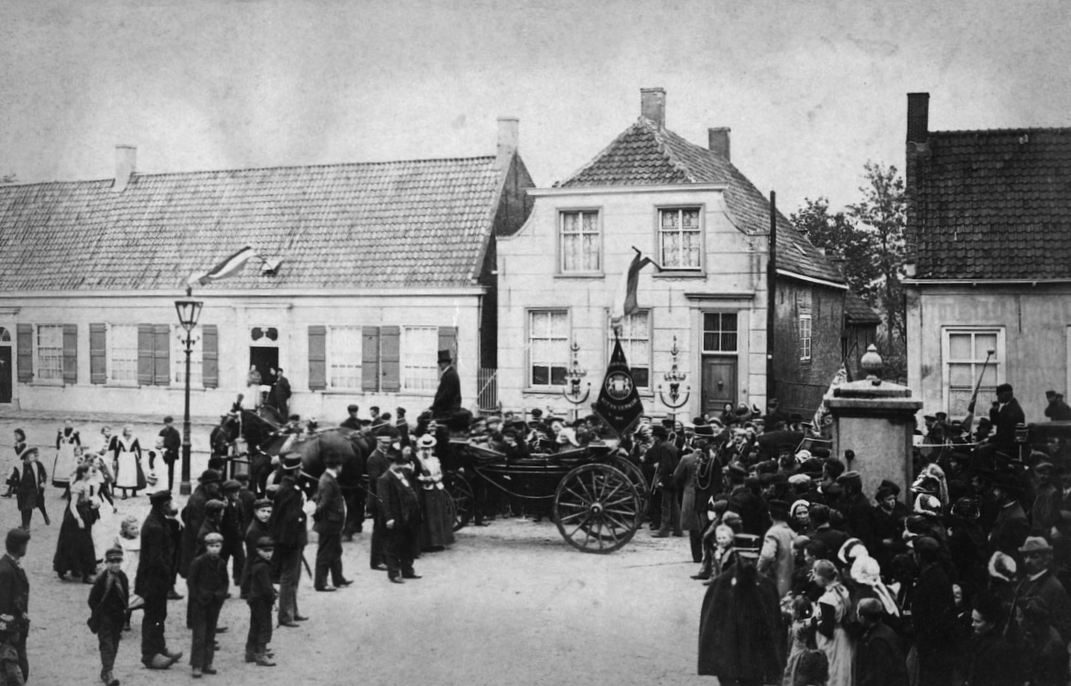
Van Gogh's birthplace in Zundert

- March 30: Vincent Willem van Gogh is born in Zundert.

== 1855 ==
- February 17: sister Anna Cornelia van Gogh, (1855–1930), called Anna, is born.

== 1857 ==
- May 1: brother Theodorus van Gogh, called Theo, is born.

== 1859 ==
- May 16: sister Elisabeth Huberta van Gogh, (1859–1936), called Lies, is born.

== 1861 ==
- March 26: Uncle Cent becomes partner of Goupil & Cie.

== 1862 ==
- March 16: sister Willemina Jacoba van Gogh, (1862–1941), called Wil, is born.

== 1864 ==
- October 1: in Zevenbergen to attend the school of Jan Provily.

== 1866 ==
- August: leaves Zevenbergen.
- September 3: enters secondary school at Tilburg: the Koning Willem II school.

== 1867 ==
- May 17: brother Cornelis Vincent van Gogh, (1867–1900), called Cor, is born.

== 1868 ==
- March: leaves Tilburg and returns to his family in Zundert.

== 1869 ==
- July 30: Vincent starts apprenticeship with Goupil & Cie, The Hague.

== 1871 ==
- January: Van Gogh's family moves to Helvoirt.

== 1872 ==
- January 29: Uncle Cent, until then one of three shareholders of Goupil & Cie., retires from business, but continues holding his share, now 6/30 (and formerly 1/3?); Adolphe and Albert Goupil hold 7/30 each, and Léon Goupil 10/30.

== 1873 ==
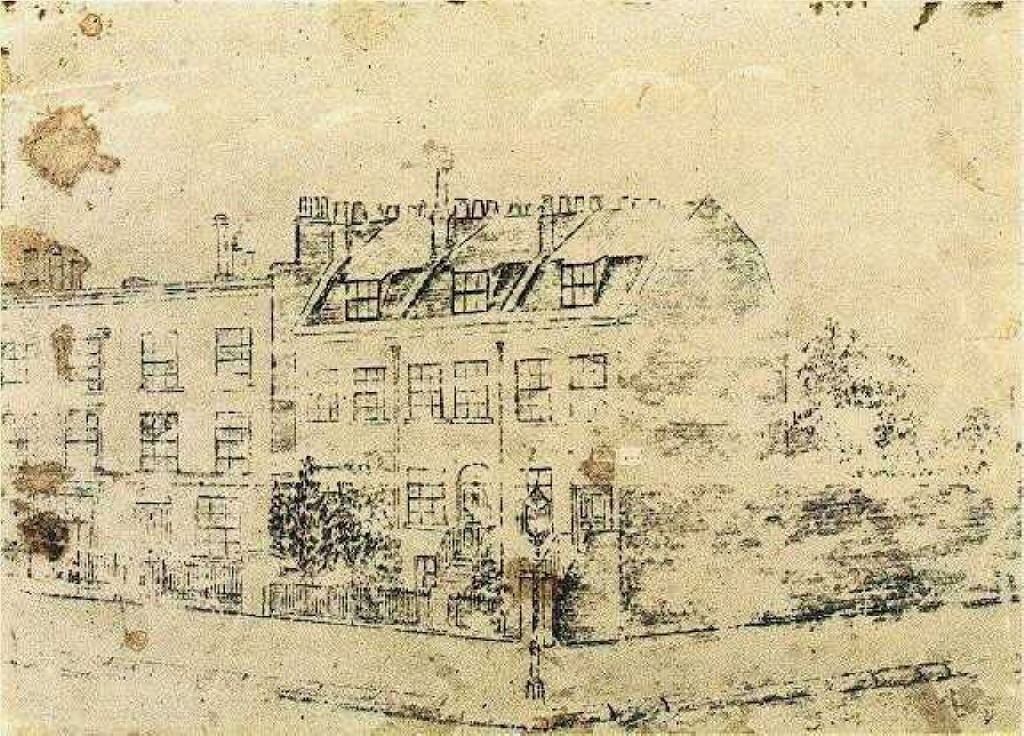
Van Gogh's drawing of 87 Hackford Road

- January 1: Theo starts apprenticeship with Goupil & Cie, Brussels.
- February 19: the lot to serve in the army has fallen on Vincent, but his father bought him out (and therefore, according to Dutch law, his younger brothers Theo and Cor, too).
- May 12: Vincent leaves for Paris where he visits the Paris branches of Goupil & Cie, the annual Salon and the Musée du Luxembourg.
- a week later: takes up work at the London branch of Goupil & Cie; it is not known where he first lodged.
- August: moves to the house of Ursula Loyer and her daughter Eugenie in Brixton, 87 Hackford Road.

== 1874 ==
- June 27 - July 15: summer holiday with his family in Helvoirt.
- August: moves to Kennington (Ivy Cottage, 395 Kennington Road).
- November: on the demand of Uncle Cent, Vincent is transferred to Paris to get acquainted with the headquarters of Goupil & Cie.
- November 26: Jet Carbentus, a cousin of Vincent, marries Anton Mauve.
- Christmas: with his family in Helvoirt.

== 1875 ==
- January 2: returns to London.
- May 24: Goupil's London opens its first exhibition.
- end of May: Vincent is re-transferred to Paris headquarters.
- October 18: Van Gogh's family moves to Etten.
- Christmas: with his family in Etten.
- December 30: visits Uncle C. M. in the Hague to talk about his future.
- December 31: Vincent's father advises Vincent to resign from Goupil & Cie.

== 1876 ==
- January 4: back to Paris, a talk with Léon Boussod ends with Van Gogh's resignation from Goupil & Cie.
- February 19: sends a letter to Theo, stating, 'No news yet from Scarborough' after presumably applying for a teaching post.
- March 30: his last day at Goupil's.
- March 31: returns to Etten for a fortnight.
- April 7: Theo, too, is on a visit in Etten.
- April 14: Vincent leaves for England.
- April 16: arrives at Ramsgate to teach at the school of William Stokes, 6 Royal Road; he lodges nearby at 11 Spencer Square.
- June: Stokes transfers his school to Linkfield House, 183 Twickenham Road, Isleworth.
- July 3: Van Gogh moves to the school of Reverend Thomas Slade-Jones (1829–1883) at Holme Court, 158 Twickenham Road, Isleworth.
- September 26:Theo misses work because he has fallen seriously ill.
- October 23:Theo still ill; his mother travels to Etten.
- October 29: Vincent's first sermon at Richmond Methodist Church.
- November 16:Theo finally well enough to leave Etten.
- Christmas: Vincent returns to Etten.

== 1877 ==
- January to May: works as a bookseller's assistant in Dordrecht.
- May 14: moves to Amsterdam to study for entrance into the university.

== 1878 ==
- ?: Uncle Cent withdraws his shares from Goupil & Cie.
- March: Tersteeg has recommended Theo to assist Goupil & Cie in Paris during the World's Fair.
- July 5: Vincent abandons studies and returns to Etten.
- July 16–17: father introduces Vincent to the governors of the Evangelical College (Vlaamse opleidingsschool) in Laeken, a suburb of Brussels, accompanied by Reverend Jones. (One of six founders in 1875 was Abraham van der Waeyen Pieterszen).
- 24 August: having postponed his departure to assist at the wedding of his sister Anna (August 21), Vincent moves to Laeken.
- October 27: C. M. Vos, husband of Kee Vos Stricker, dies.
- December: fails exams.
- December 26: turns to the Committee of the Evangelical College (Comité d'Evangélisation) and asks to be accepted for a post in the Borinage.

== 1879 ==
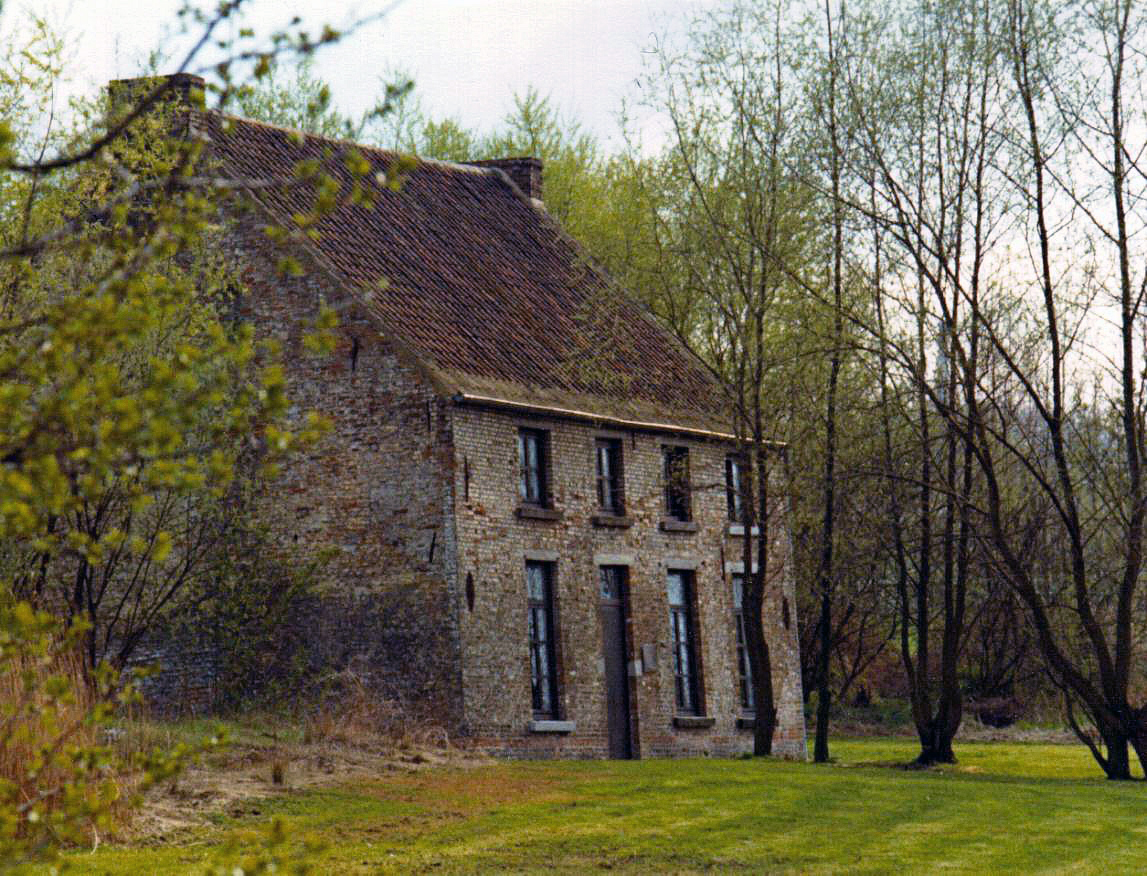
The house where Van Gogh stayed in Cuesmes in 1879

- January: for 6 months on trial, Vincent is accepted to do evangelical work in the Borinage.
- late June: Vincent learns his temporary contract will not be renewed; he is given three months to find something else.
- July 31: his contract ends.
- August 1: next day, Vincent sets out on a first walk to find employment, all across the Borinage up to the North. Finally, in Tournai, he shifts to North-east to visit Reverend Abraham van der Waeyen Pieterszen in Maria-Hoorebeeke, but when he arrives on Sunday afternoon (August 3), Pieterszen is out for some days in Brussels, where they meet on Monday morning (August 4).
- August 5: he is in Cuesmes "again," close to Mons; as Theo is expected to pass Mons by train soon, Vincent asks his brother to meet there.
- August ?: spends a day with Theo, leaves for Wasmes in the evening where he is lodged by J. B. Denis, Rue du Petit Wasmes à Wasmes (Hainaut).
- August 15 Vincent arrives back at Etten to stay with his parents.

== 1880 ==
- Spring ???: stays with family at Etten
- March 11: Vincent is still living with his parents.
- mid March ???: when his father tries to put him into an asylum (Gheel), he escapes to Cuesmes.
- end March ???: Vincent sets out on a second walk to find employment in the Borinage; in the end he walks to Courrières and goes to visit Jules Breton, but doesn't have the nerve to enter the property.
- April 16: Abraham van der Waeyen Pieterszen dies in Maria-Horebeke.
- first days of July: a while after his return to Cuesmes, Vincent learns that money recently sent by his parents was in fact from Theo; thanking him for his support, Vincent tries to explain his present situation; he is staying with Ch. Decrucq, Rue du Pavillon 8, Cuesmes. Theo forwarded this letter to the parents who commented on July 5.
- August 20: takes up correspondence with Theo again.
- September: works after Charles Bargue's platework (Cours de dessin), which he got on loan from Tersteeg, head of Goupil & Cie in The Hague.
- October: moves to Brussels, takes the advice of Willem Roelofs and enrolls in a beginners' art course at the Academy; as suggested by Theo, he meets Anthon van Rappard.

== 1881 ==
- April: moves back to Etten and draws.
- April 17: meets Theo.
- Mid-June: Rappard on visit in Etten.
- Summer: Kee Vos Stricker spends some time in Etten with Vincent's parents. Vincent falls in love with her.
- August 23–26: trip to The Hague; he visits Anton Mauve and Théophile de Bock, sees some exhibitions and the recently opened Panorama Mesdag.
- late November: writes letter to Uncle Stricker, and within a couple of days goes to Amsterdam in person himself.
- ?: arrives in Amsterdam and demands to see Kee but she avoids him; aunt and uncle Stricker accompany him to a good and cheap lodging, where he stays for some days.
- November 27 or December 4: "Sunday evening" at about 7 o'clock, he arrives in The Hague to stay with Anton Mauve for some time. Mauve encourages him to work in oils and watercolours.
- December 19: Vincent is still in The Hague and unable to leave, as he is short of money. A few days later he is back to Etten, and confesses that recently—evidently for the first time in his life—he sought the ministrations of a back-street girl.
- December 25: On Christmas Day, Vincent quarrels with his father, who had tried to force him to assist the Christmas service, and leaves for The Hague.

== 1882 ==
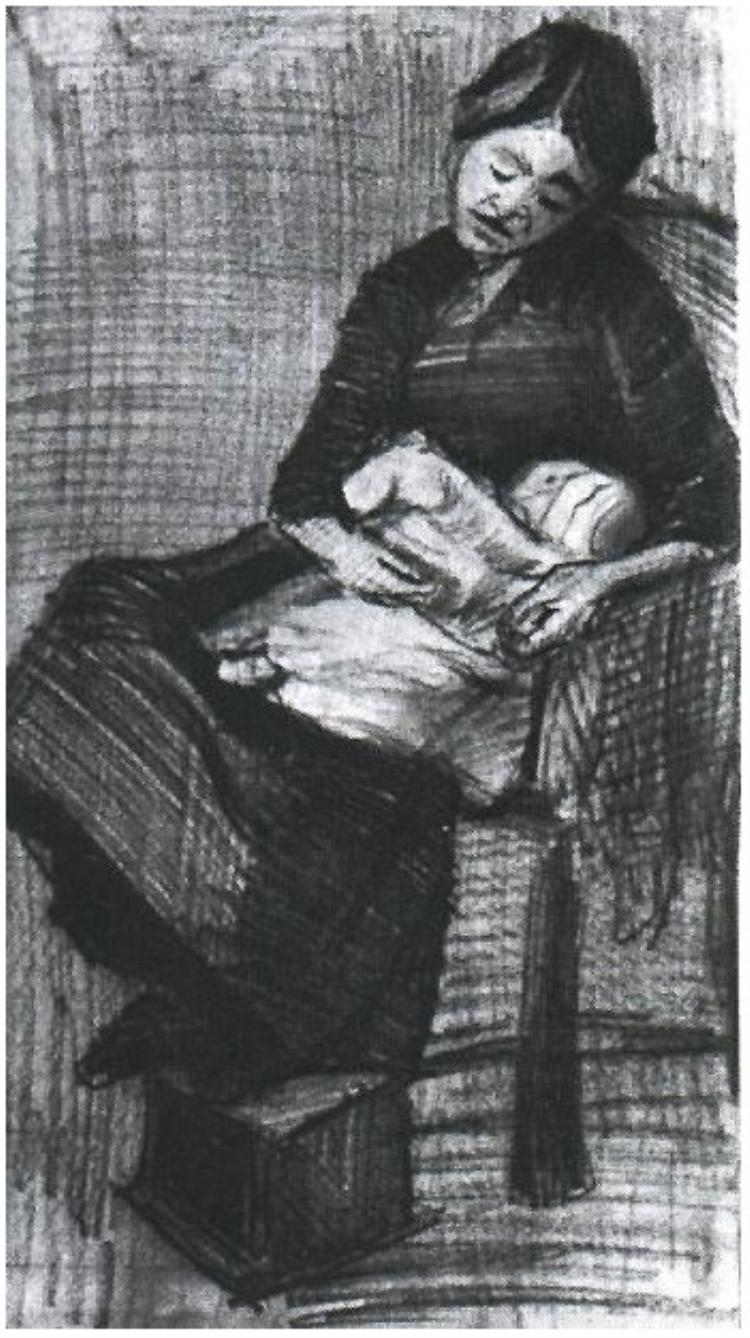
Vincent van Gogh, Sien Nursing Baby, drawing, 1882, Kröller-Müller Museum, Otterlo, The Netherlands (F1063, JH218)

- January: moves into a small studio, Schenkweg 138.
- mid to late January: meets Clasina Maria Hoornik ("Sien") and sets up a domestic relationship with her.
- June 7: admitted to municipal hospital to be treated for gonorrhea.
- July 1: leaves the hospital; in the next days he moves next door into a larger studio, Schenkweg 136 (since 1884: Schenkstraat 13).
- July 2: Sien gives birth to a baby boy, who is given the name Willem.
- August: following a visit of Theo who supplied money for colour, Van Gogh starts painting in oil at the sea coast in Scheveningen.
- November: has trial proofs of 6 lithographs printed.

== 1883 ==
- September: leaves Sien, and moves to Drenthe.
- September 11: arrives in Hoogeveen, late in the evening, and lodges with Albertus Hartsuiker, Groote Kerkstraat
- October 2: leaves Hoogeveen on the tow boat for Nieuw-Amsterdam/Veenoord: Van Gogh wrote his brother that he is staying in the first place, while his lodgings with Hendrik Scholte were indeed part of the latter village close-by.
- November 1: visits Zweeloo
- December 4: walks down from Veenoord to Hoogeveen to catch the train for Nuenen.
- December 5: Vincent arrives in Nuenen to stay with his parents.
- December 7: date of the postmark on the back of a pen drawing (F.1237) that signalized Theo his arrival in Nuenen.

== 1884 ==
- ? : the Goupil family retires, the firm is again transformed and renamed as Boussod, Valadon & Cie, successeurs de Goupil & Cie.
- January 17: descending from a train, Van Gogh's mother breaks her leg; Vincent cares for her during her recuperation.
- end March: Theo starts buying and selling Impressionists, beginning with a painting by Pissarro.
- August ???: Margot Begemann attempts suicide.

== 1885 ==
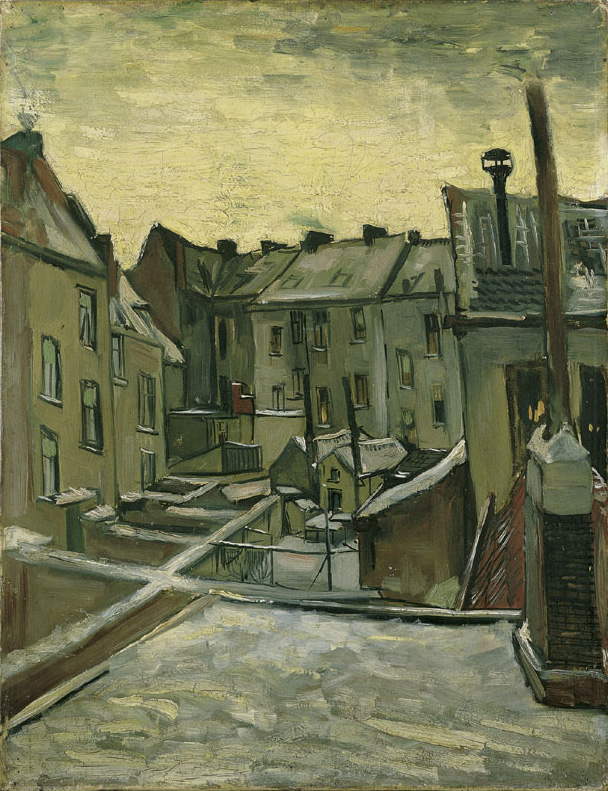
View from the rear window of Van Gogh's room, Antwerp

- March 26: Vincent's father dies.
- March 27: Theo travels to Nuenen for the funeral.
- March 30: father's funeral.
- May: Vincent leaves his mother's house.
- July: on their way back to the Netherlands to spend their holidays with their parents, Theo and Andries Bonger visit the museums in Lille, Bruges, Ghent and Antwerp.
- c. July 28 - August 7: Theo stays in Nuenen.
- August 7: Theo visits Bonger in Amsterdam and meets his sister Johanna ("Jo") for the first time.
- August: first public display of works by Van Gogh, in windows of the art dealer Leurs in The Hague.
- October 6–8: visit to Amsterdam and the Rijksmuseum.
- November 24: leaves for Antwerp.

== 1886 ==
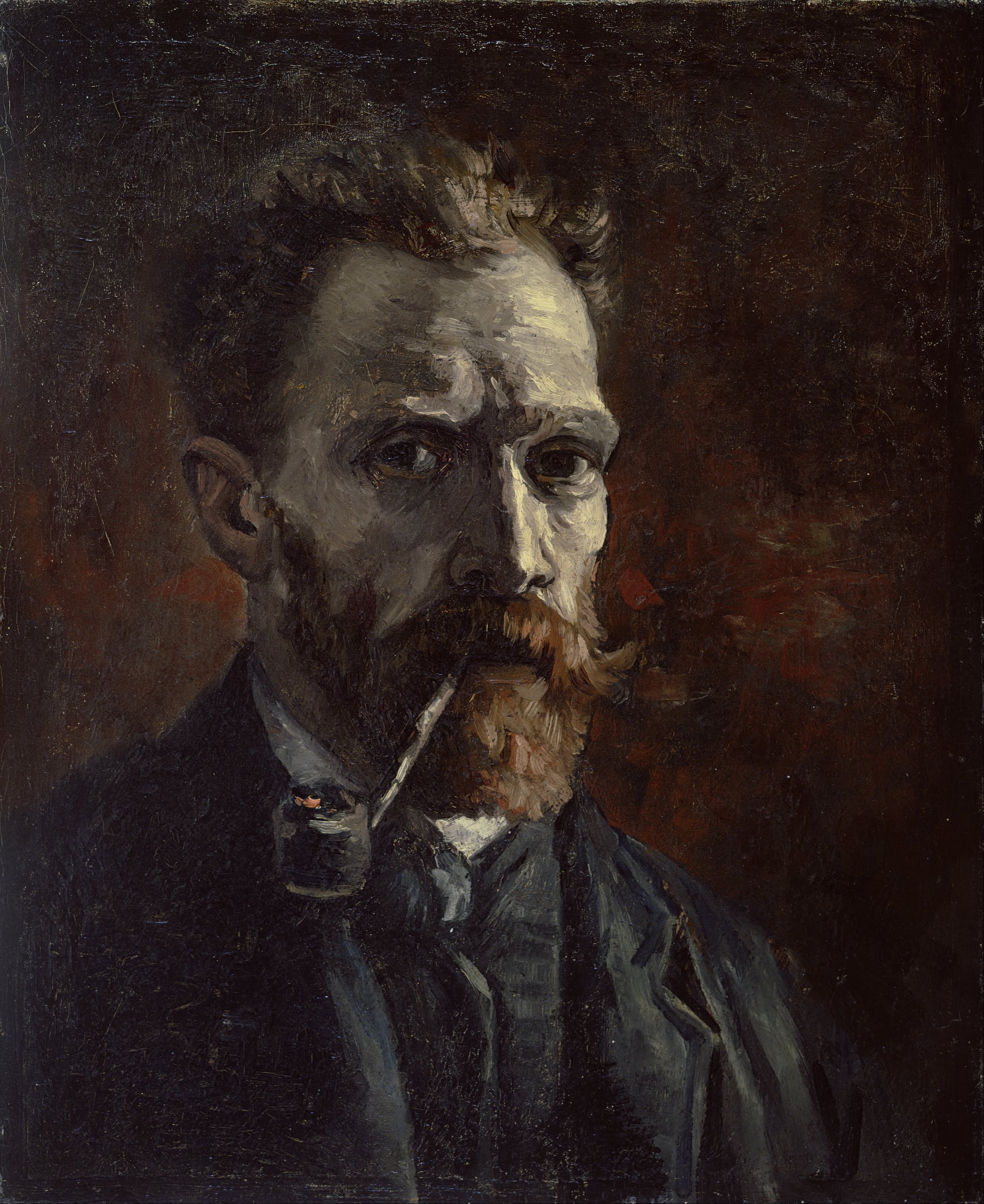
Vincent van Gogh - Self-portrait with pipe, September 1886

- January 18: enrolls in Antwerp Academy of Art (Koninklijke Academie van Beeldende Kunsten) for the winter term 1885-1886 in the Antique class.
- February
- early March: arrives in Paris and asks Theo to see him in the Louvre. Moves in with Theo in his apartment in Rue de Laval.
- March - June (?): studies for three months at studio of Fernand Cormon.
- April 3: relegated by the council of the Antwerp Academy to the entrance course; by this time Van Gogh is already in Paris.
- May 15: Opening of the 8th Impressionist exhibition; running through June 15.

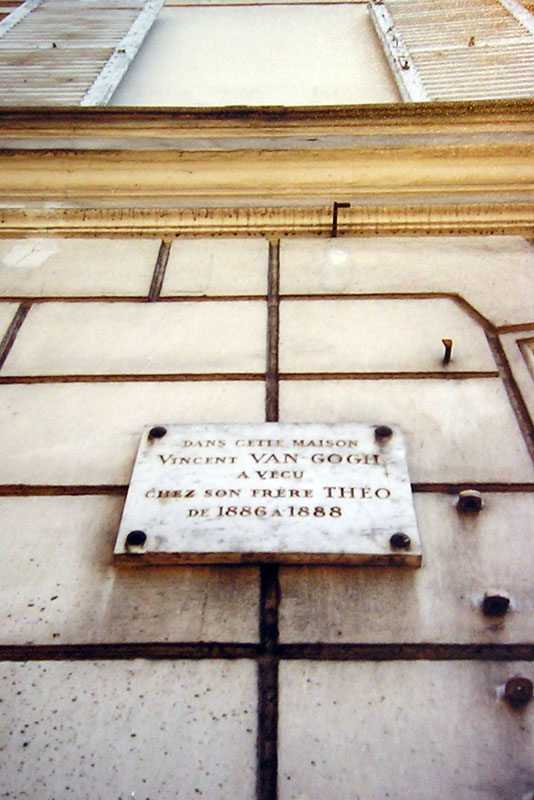
The house where Vincent and Theo van Gogh lived: 54, Rue Lepic in Paris

- June: the Van Gogh brothers move from Rue de Laval to a larger apartment, Rue Lepic 54.
- August: Theo is on vacation in the Netherlands; discusses with family and uncles his plan to establish an art gallery of his own. Meanwhile, Vincent falls ill, and for some time Andries Bonger shares the apartment to care for Vincent and "S.," Theo's mistress.
- August 19 or 26: Theo is back in Paris.
- August 21: Opening of the 2nd exhibition of the Artistes Indépendants; running through September 21.
- October 25: Van Gogh proposes an exchange of works with Charles Angrand.

== 1887 ==
- January: Vincent signs his first portrait of "Père" Tanguy, and later this year portraits of "Mère" Tanguy and one of their friends.
- March 11: Theo states that it is impossible to get on with Vincent.
- March 26: Opening of the 3rd exhibition of the Artistes Indépendants; running through June 8.
- April 26: Vincent and Theo have made peace.
- Spring: Vincent paints in Asnières.
- November 14: Paul Gauguin arrives in Paris, just back from Martinique.
- December: Gauguin consigns paintings to Theo.
- December 26: Theo's first sale of a painting by Gauguin
- December/January (?): Vincent arranges an exhibition of paintings by himself, Bernard, Anquetin, and (probably) Toulouse-Lautrec in the Restaurant du Chalet, 43 Avenue de Clichy, on Montmartre. Bernard and Anquetin sell their first painting, Vincent exchanges work with Gauguin.

== 1888 ==
- January 1: Theo, accompanied by a second person (probably Manzi, not Vincent?), visits Gauguin in his atelier and acquires 3 paintings for Boussod & Valadon.
- January 4: Theo acquires, privately, Gauguin's Negresses, and a seascape by Manzi
- January 12: Theo acquires, privately, Toulouse-Lautrec's "Poudre de riz."
- February 5: Anton Mauve dies.
- February 19: Vincent departs from Paris.
- February 20: arrives in Arles.
- March 22: Opening of the 4th exhibition of the Artistes Indépendants; Van Gogh contributes 3 paintings.
- May 1: takes lease on the Yellow House.
- June: works for a week in Saintes-Maries-de-la-Mer.
- September 8: buys two beds for the Yellow House.
- September 17: spends first night in the Yellow House.
- October 23: Paul Gauguin arrives to stay with Vincent.
- November: Gauguin receives the invitation to exhibit with Les XX in spring 1889.
- December: Gauguin and Van Gogh on a trip to Montpellier visit the Musée Fabre to see the Bruyas collection.
- December 22: Gauguin shows Van Gogh his portrait of him. Van Gogh reacts by saying "It's me gone mad." That evening, in a local cafe, the two argue and Van Gogh throws a glass at Gauguin.
- December 23: Van Gogh awakes in the morning unable to recall the events of the previous evening except for a vague recollection of having offended Gauguin, for which he apologises. Van Gogh receives a letter from Theo in which he announces his engagement to Johanna Bonger. In the evening Van Gogh and Gauguin argue again. Van Gogh cuts off his left ear and takes it, wrapped in paper, to a local brothel where he gives the ear to a woman named Rachel, asking her to look after it for him. Gauguin spends the night in a local hotel.
- December 24: In the early morning Van Gogh is found by the local police, covered in blood and apparently lifeless. Gauguin arrives at the Yellow House to find a crowd outside and is promptly arrested for Van Gogh's murder. Gauguin and the local chief of police enter the house together and go up to Van Gogh's bedroom where Van Gogh responds to being touched and spoken to by Gauguin. Gauguin is released from custody and makes plans to leave Arles as soon as possible. Van Gogh is taken to the Old Hospital in Arles.
- December 25: Theo visits Vincent in hospital; that evening Theo and Gauguin leave for Paris.

== 1889 ==
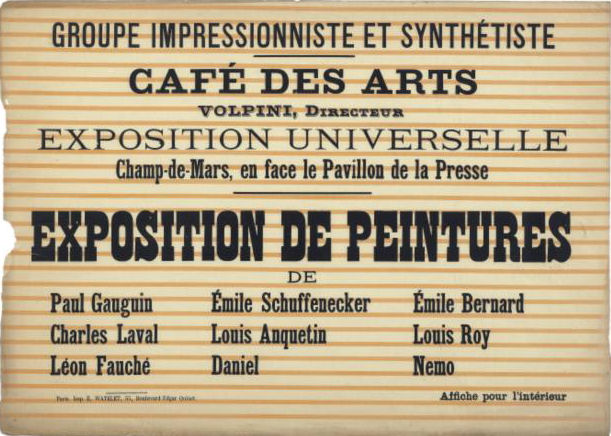
Poster of the 1889 Exhibition of Paintings by the Impressionist and Synthetist Group, at Café des Arts, known as The Volpini Exhibition, 1889.

- January 5: Theo goes to Amsterdam.
- January 8: Vincent leaves hospital.
- January 9: engagement party of Theo and Johanna Bonger in Amsterdam.
- January 14: Theo goes back to Paris.
- February 7: Vincent is again taken to hospital after a second mental breakdown.
- February 17: he leaves hospital again.
- February 18: citizens' petition against Van Gogh.
- February 26: he is confined to hospital on police orders.
- March 23–24: at the request of Theo Paul Signac visits Vincent in hospital.
- March 31: Theo departs for Amsterdam.
- April 18: Theo marries Johanna Bonger.
- May 8: Vincent admits himself to the asylum at Saint-Rémy-de-Provence; the only other option was to be transferred to an asylum elsewhere.
- early June: Gauguin and friends organize an exhibition of their works in the Café Volpini (Exposition des Peintures du Groupe impressioniste et synthétiste, faite dans le local de M. Volpini au Champ-de-Mars 1889); Vincent is invited to participate, but Theo thinks it is inappropriate.
- July 8: visit to Arles.
- July 15: last batch of paintings from Arles sent to Paris.
- July 18: Van Gogh has another mental breakdown, lasting until the end of August.
- September: Van Gogh takes up work again.
- September 3: Opening of the 5th exhibition of the Artistes Indépendants, running through October 4; Van Gogh contributes 2 paintings.
- November 15: Octave Maus, secretary of Les XX, invites Van Gogh to participate in their forthcoming 7th annual exhibition in February 1890; Van Gogh accepts.

== 1890 ==
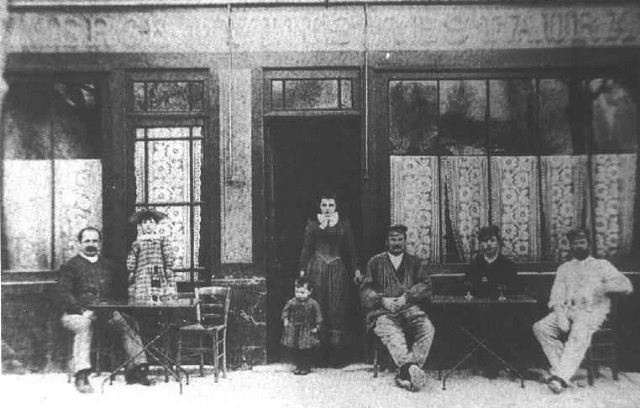
Auberge Ravoux in Auvers

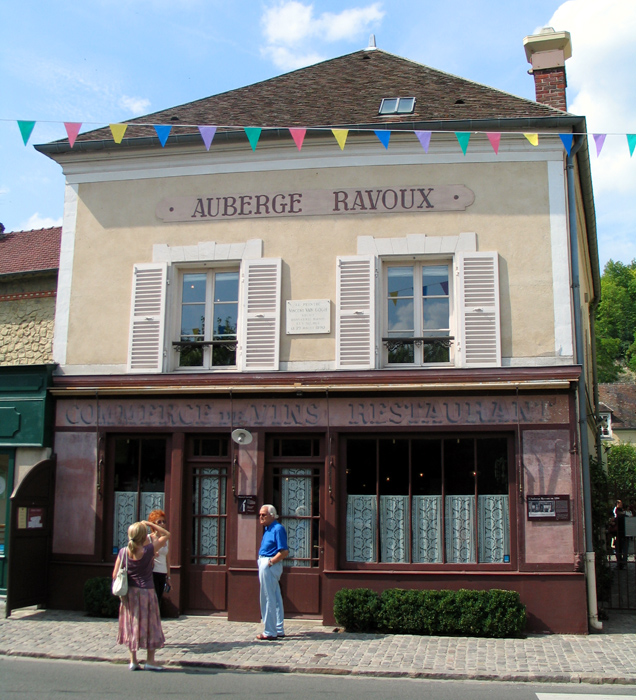
L’Auberge Ravoux, in Auvers-sur-Oise, where Vincent van Gogh spent his final months and where he died. It is now a French listed historic building and a tourist attraction incorporating a restaurant.

- January 18: Opening of the 7th annual exhibition of Les XX, Brussels, running through February 23; Van Gogh contributes 6 paintings, one of them is sold to Anna Boch. At the dinner, Henry de Groux insults van Gogh's paintings and refuses to allow his work to be displayed alongside Van Gogh's; Toulouse-Lautrec challenges de Groux to a duel in Van Gogh's defense, and Signac declares that he would continue in Van Gogh's defense if Lautrec should be killed. De Groux is subsequently expelled from les XX.
- January 31: Theo's son Vincent Willem van Gogh is born.
- February 22–23: while on a visit to Arles, Van Gogh falls ill and has to be brought back to Saint-Rémy on a carriage. This crisis, lasting about nine weeks until the last days of April, is the longest recorded.
- March 20: Opening of the 6th exhibition of the Artistes Indépendants, running through April 27; Van Gogh contributes 10 paintings, 5 of which have already been shown at Les XX in Brussels. Gauguin, Armand Guillaumin and other colleagues propose to exchange works; Monet sends his congratulations.
- May 1: recovered, he has taken up work again.
- May 3: Vincent writes to Theo accepting his suggestion that he move back to Paris.
- early May: Vincent contacts friends announcing his departure from Saint Rémy and, in preparation, begins giving paintings away.
- May 16: Vincent is discharged from Saint Rémy, he travels to Paris, arrives May 17, at 10 in the morning.
- May 17–20: stays with Theo in Paris.
- May 20: moves to Auvers-sur-Oise.
- June 8: Theo and family visit.
- early July: Theo and Jo's son falls ill.
- July 6: makes a day trip to Paris to see Theo, Jo and his sick nephew; arguments ensue.
- July 15: Theo accompanies his wife and son to the Netherlands, travelling via Antwerp.
- July 19: Theo returns to Paris alone, leaving his wife and child in the Netherlands for a holiday.
- July 23: business forces Theo out for a day in Antwerp. Vincent writes his last letter (to Theo).
- July 27 Sunday evening: Vincent injures himself with a gun; Dr. Gachet is summoned at 9 p.m.
- July 28 Monday morning: Theo arrives at his brother's bedside.
- July 29: Vincent dies, at 1.30 in the morning. Among his last words: "I wanted it to end like this."
- July 30: funeral, assisted by Theo, Gachet, Tanguy, Bernard, Laval, Lucien Pissarro, Lauzet and others.
- August 7: L'Echo Pontoisien, a weekly published every Thursday, reports Van Gogh's death by suicide.
- September 14: Theo and his young family move next door.
- September 20: Theo, assisted by Émile Bernard, mounts an improvised retrospective exhibition of his brother's works in Theo's former apartment.
- October 9: Theo collapses mentally and physically, and is admitted to the Maison Dubois hospital, Faubourg St. Denis and later to a clinic in Passy.
- November 18: Theo is transferred to the Willem Arntzkliniek in Utrecht.

== 1891 ==
- January 25: Theo dies and is buried in De Built. In 1914, Theo's body was exhumed and reburied with his brother at Auvers-sur-Oise.
