= Maison Van Gogh =

Museum near Mons, Belgium

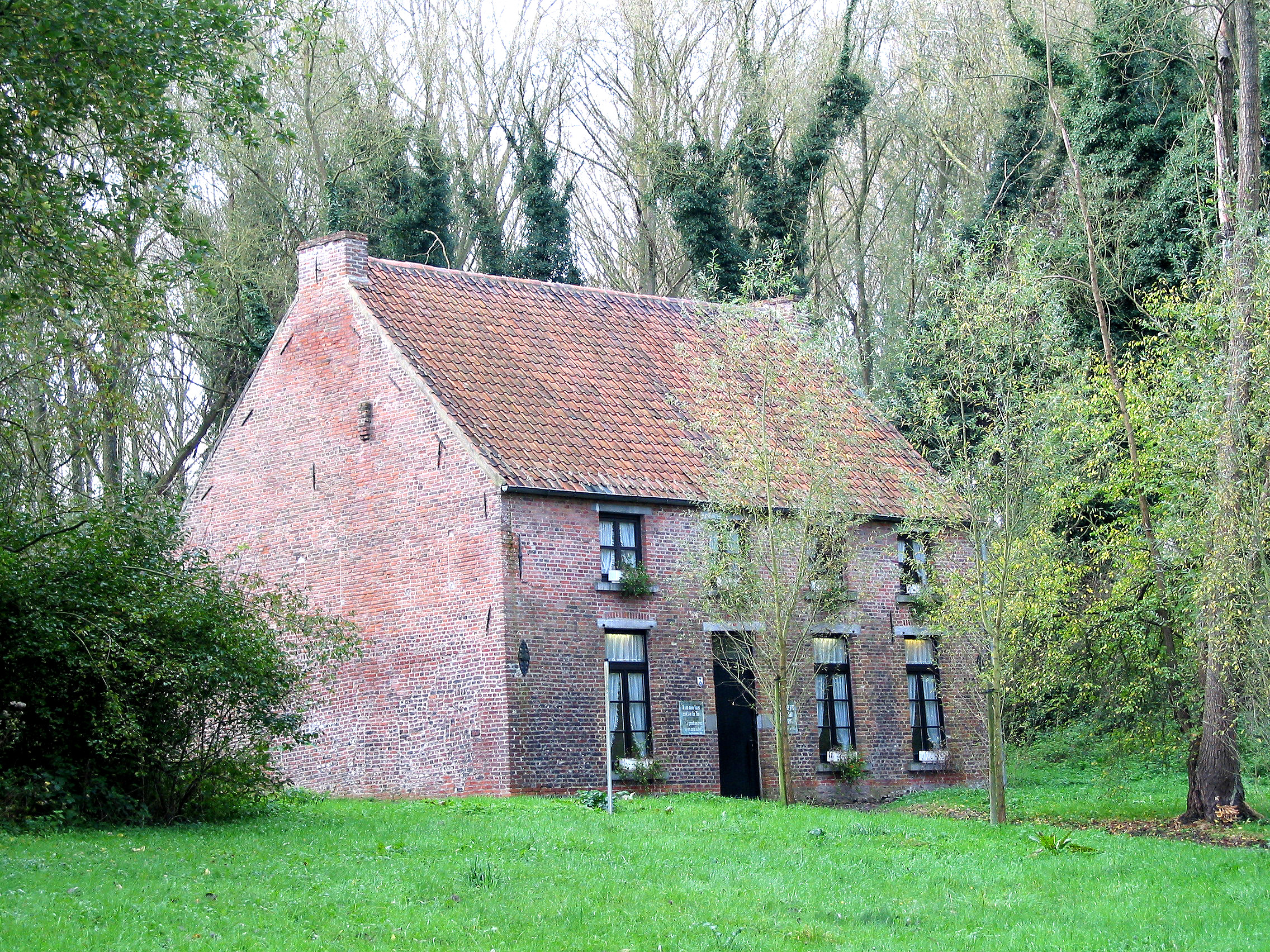
- Interactive map of the Maison Van Gogh area

General information
- Location: Rue du Pavillon, 3; 7033 Cuesmes, Belgium
- Coordinates: 50°26′29″N 3°55′31″E

Website
- http://en.maisonvangogh.mons.be/

Maison Van Gogh (lit. 'Van Gogh House') is a small historic house museum located in Cuesmes, near Mons, in Belgium associated with the Dutch artist Vincent van Gogh (1853-1890).

As a young man, Van Gogh pursued a career as a Protestant preacher and evangelist among the largely Catholic coal miners working the Borinage between 1878 and 1880. After moving between a few houses in nearby villages, he moved in as a lodger to the household of the miner Charles Decrucq and his family at Cuesmes in 1880 where he lived for several months. The house was known locally as the Maison de Marais (lit. 'Marsh house').

This period is particularly notable in Van Gogh's biography because it was likely at Cuesmes in August 1880 that he decided to abandon his missionary career and become a professional artist.

== Background ==
Belgium was one of the first countries to experience the Industrial Revolution in continental Europe. It was driven primarily by the surge in coal and steel industries located in the sillon industriel along the Sambre and Meuse river valleys. On the far western side was the emerging coal mining region of the Borinage around the city of Mons.

By the late 19th century, the surge of demand for coal had attracted an influx of workers from the countryside who settled in a sprawling belt of mining villages close to the mines surrounded by slag heaps. Working and living conditions among the miners and their families were extremely poor. Most lived in small, rudimentary, often overcrowded houses known locally as corons. The art historian Martin Bailey observes that "one can hardly imagine and gloomier and more depressing environment".

== Van Gogh's stay, 1878-1880 ==
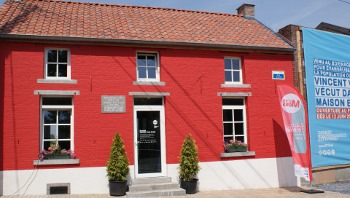
The house of the Denis family in Wasmes where Van Gogh initially lodged in 1879

Van Gogh arrived in the Borinage in December 1878. He spent his first weeks in Pâturages before moving a short distance to nearby Wasmes where he lived as a lodger with a farmer called Jean-Baptiste Denis and his wife Estere. In February 1879, Van Gogh was employed by the Union of Protestant Evangelical Churches of Belgium (Union des Eglises Protestantes Evangéliques de Belgique) on a probationary six-month contract as an evangelist with the aim of preaching to local miners in order to convert them from Catholicism. He was taken on a visit into the mine at the nearby Charbonnage de Marcasse in Wasmes in April 1879. As a result of his eccentricity, Van Gogh failed to establish a rapport with the miners despite feeling considerable sympathy for their situation. His contract was terminated on the end of his probationary period in July 1879.

Although no longer employed, Van Gogh was determined to remain in the Borinage as an unpaid independent evangelist. He moved a short distance to Cuesmes in August 1879. He lived initially with a mine foreman and preacher called Edouard Francq before moving, possibly in July 1880, into the next door house to lodge with a miner called Charles Decrucq and his wife Jeanne. Van Gogh shared a room with the couple's children.

While staying with Decrucq's family, Vincent sketched and painted local scenes. Two sketches given to Decrucq survive although much of his work from this period has been lost. A watercolour depicting a nearby coke works painted in the summer of 1879 also survives. He wrote to his brother Theo in August 1880 that he had decided to become an artist. He left Cuesmes for Brussels to train as an artist.

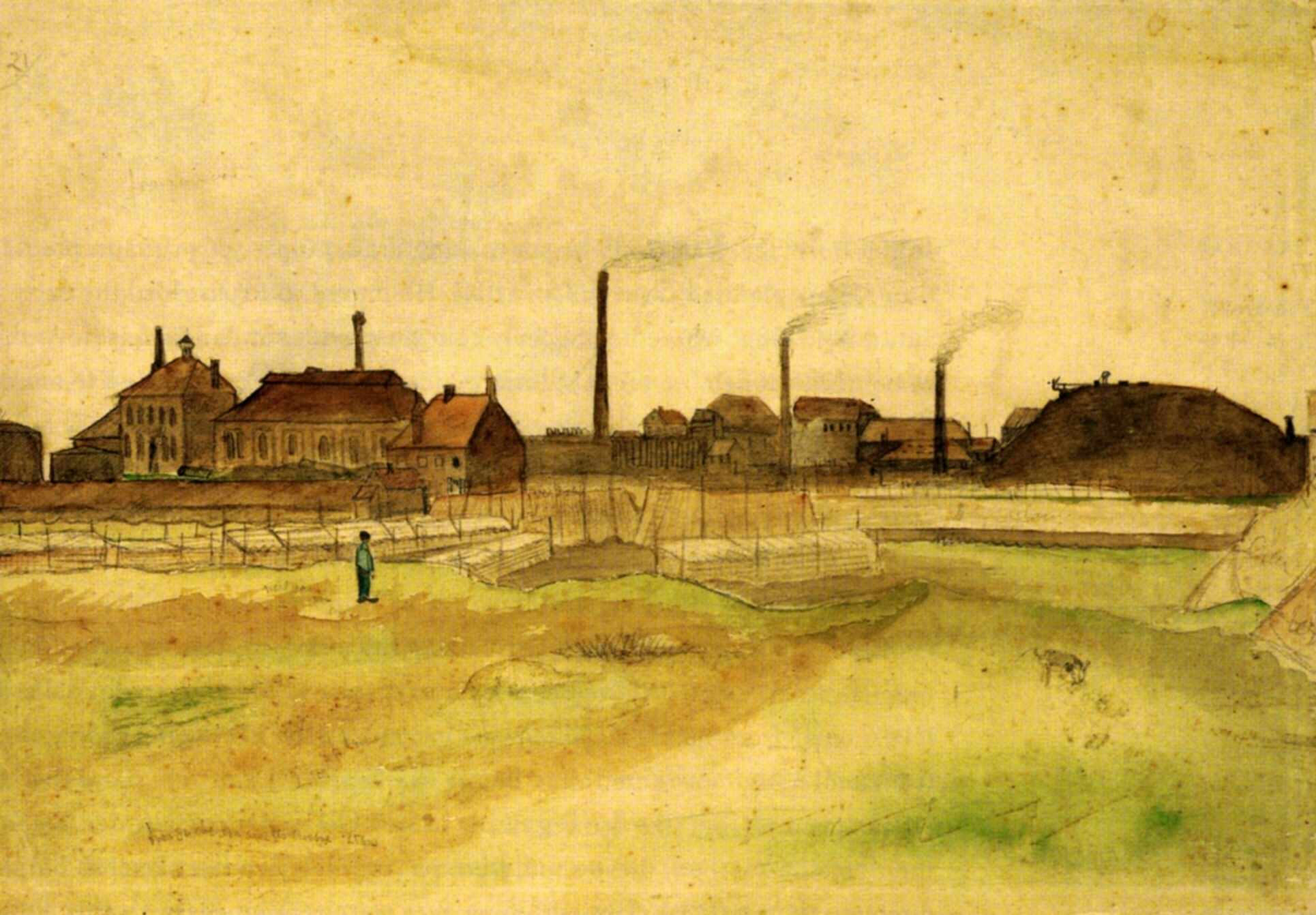
Coke Factory in the Borinage, c.July-August 1879 (Van Gogh Museum)

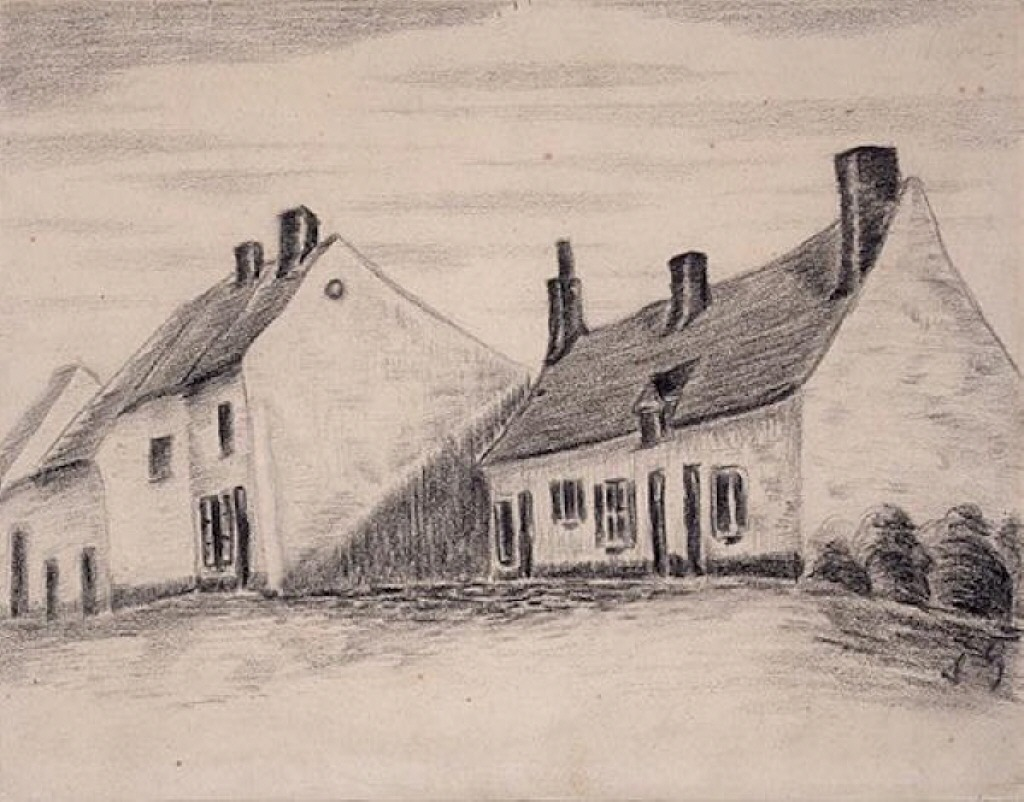
Zandmennik House, Cuesmes, c.June-September 1880 (National Gallery of Art)

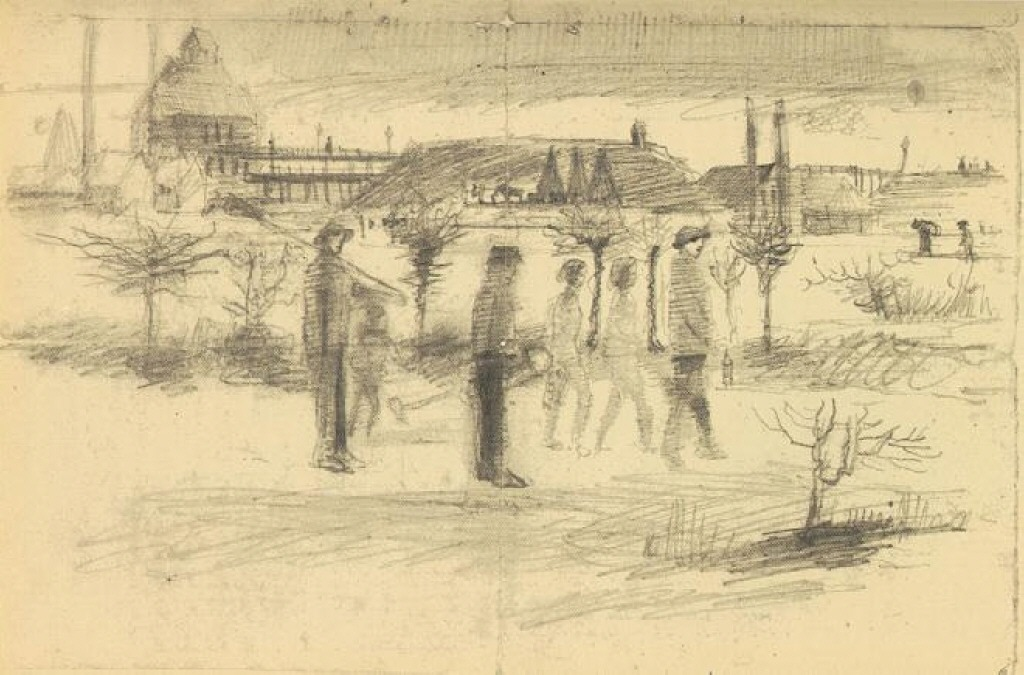
Miners in the Snow, August 1880

== Museum ==
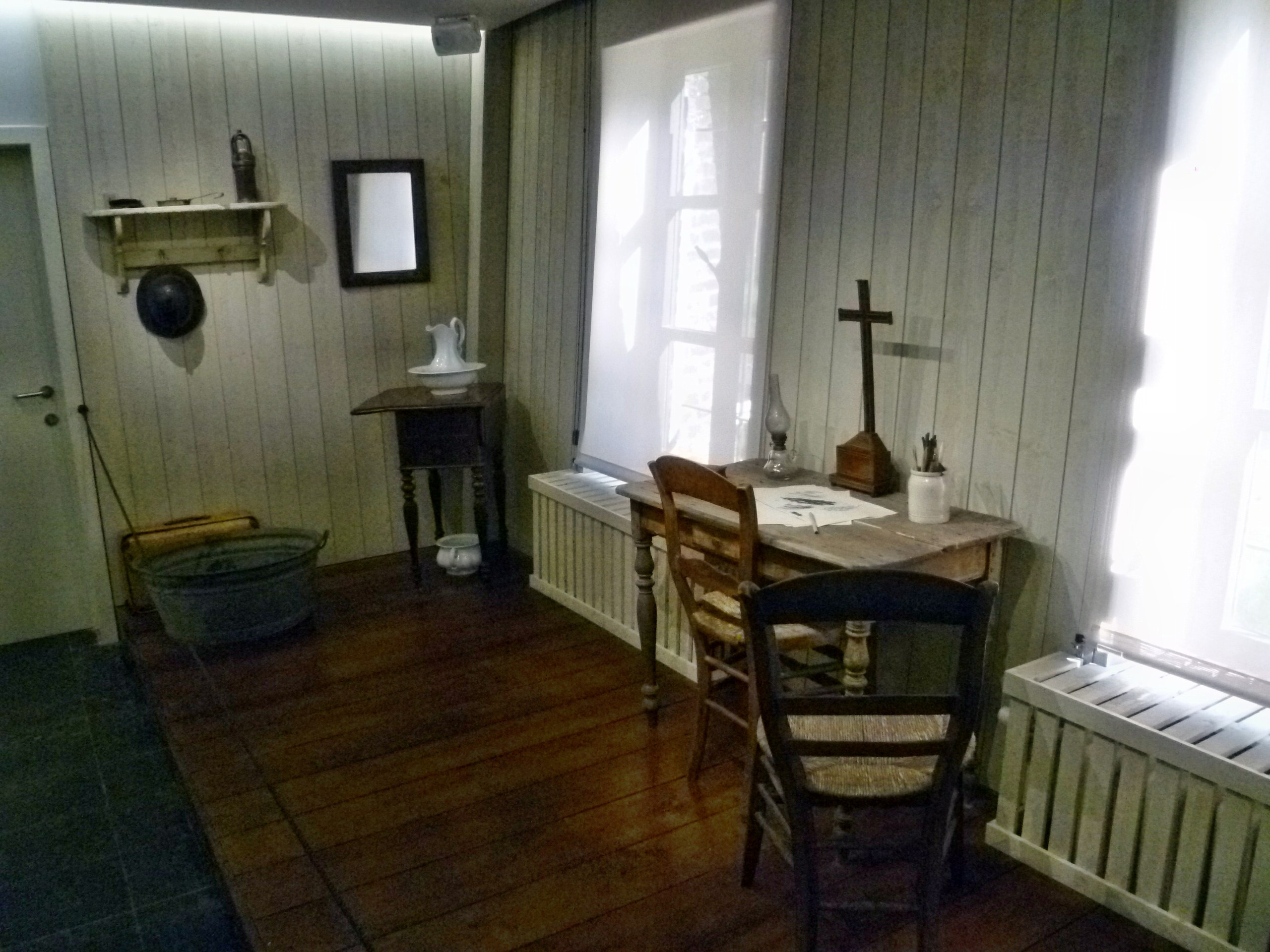
Interior of the museum in 2015

After being abandoned for almost a century and largely derelict, the Decrucq house in Cuesmes was purchased by the municipality of Mons in January 1972. It was thoroughly restored from 2005 to 2007. It is now preserved as a museum known as the Maison Van Gogh (lit. 'Van Gogh House'). A scenographic tour follows the painter along the roads of his turbulent life. Reproductions of his abundant correspondence give an idea of his activities during his stay in the Borinage. The painter's original drawing entitled Les Bêcheurs (after Jean-François Millet), sketched in 1880, is also on display.

The museum is open to visitors from Tuesday to Saturday. The address is: 3 rue du pavillon, B-7033 Cuesmes (Mons), Belgium. The Maison van Gogh is a partner of the Van Gogh Museum in Amsterdam, the Netherlands.

== See also ==
- Vincent van Gogh chronology
- Belgian strike of 1886
- Van Gogh House (Drenthe)
- Van Gogh Museum
