= Charles Lemaire =

Charles Lemaire may refer to:

- Charles LeMaire (1897–1985), American costume designer
- Charles Antoine Lemaire (1800–1871), French botanist and botanical author
- Charles Lemaire (explorer) (1863–1926), Belgian esperantist and explorer
