= Colfontaine =

Municipality in Hainaut Province, Wallonia, Belgium

Colfontaine Colfontinne (Picard)
- Municipality
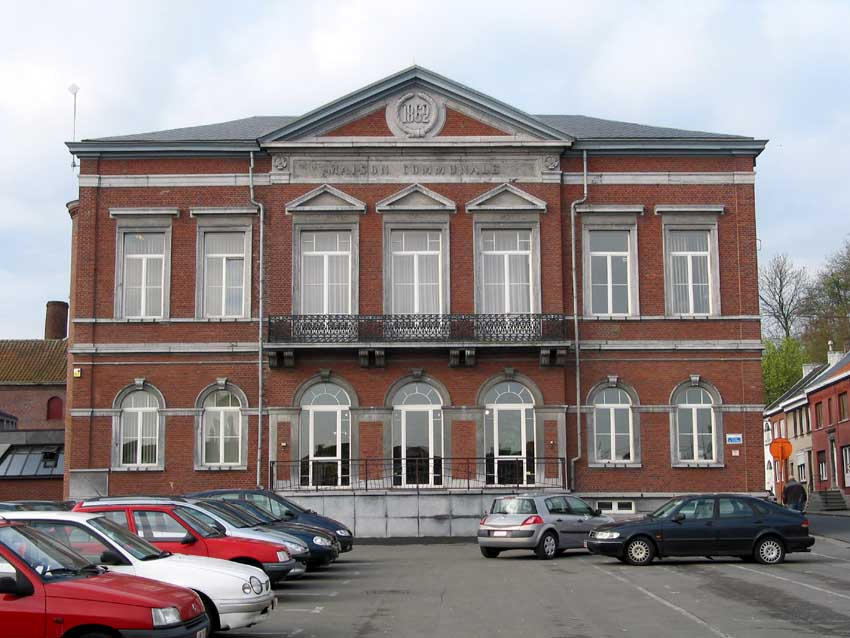
- Colfontaine Town Hall

- Flag Coat of arms

- Location of Colfontaine in Hainaut
- Interactive map of Colfontaine
- Location in Belgium
- Coordinates: 50°25′N 03°51′E
- Country: Belgium
- Community: French Community
- Region: Wallonia
- Province: Hainaut
- Arrondissement: Mons

Government
  - Mayor: Luciano D'Antonio
  - Governing party: PS

Area
  - Total: 13.75 km^{2} (5.31 sq mi)

Population (2018-01-01)
  - Total: 20,762
  - Density: 1,510/km^{2} (3,911/sq mi)
- Postal codes: 7340
- NIS code: 53082
- Area codes: 065
- Website: www.colfontaine.be

Colfontaine (French pronunciation: [kɔlfɔ̃tɛn]; Walloon: Colfontinne; Picard: Colfontinne) is a municipality of Wallonia located in the province of Hainaut, Belgium.

On 1 January 2006, the municipality had 20,021 inhabitants. The total area is 13.62 km^{2}, giving a population density of 1,470 inhabitants per km^{2}.

The municipality consists of the following districts: Pâturages, Warquignies, Wasmes (town centre; it includes the village of Petit Wasmes).

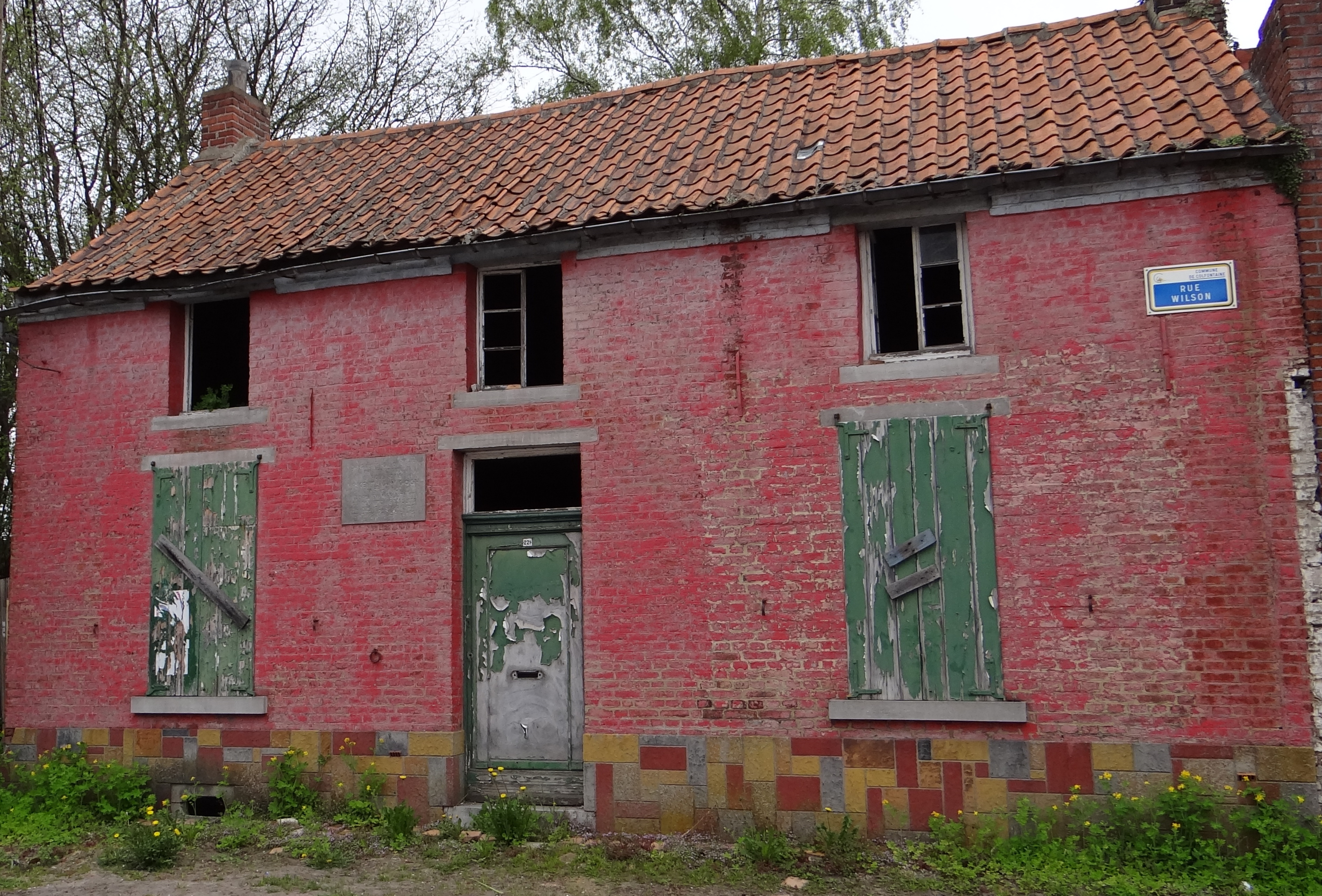
House in Wasmes where Vincent van Gogh resided in 1878-1879
