= Léon Fiévez =

Belgian official of the Congo Free State

Victor Léon Fiévez

Commissioner of Équateur District
- In office 1 April 1893 – 1895
- Preceded by: Charles Lemaire
- Succeeded by: Gustave-Émile Sarrazyn

Personal details
- Born: 30 April 1855 Wallonia, Belgium, Havré-Mons
- Died: 27 May 1939 (aged 84)
- Occupation: Soldier, colonial administrator

Victor Léon Fiévez (30 April 1855 – 27 May 1939) was a Belgian official of the Congo Free State. While employed by the Congo Free State, Fiévez became notorious for his cruel methods of enforcing rubber production in his territory, included the wide-scale oppression and killing of native Congolese. Fiévez's actions accrued significant coverage in the foreign press, forcing his removal from office and return to Belgium.

== Biography ==
Fiévez was born to a farming family in Wallonia, Belgium. In 1888 he was recruited into the Force Publique, a military force formed to garrison Leopold II of Belgium's Congo Free State, arriving in the Congo in the town of Boma. Though the conquest of the Congo was well underway by 1888, Fievez quickly became noted as a particularly effective soldier, successfully leading military expeditions in the upper Congo. In late 1891 he was forced by illness to return to Belgium, but by 1893 had returned again to the Congo. When the commissioner for the crown-controlled district of Équateur, former explorer Charles Lemaire, was wounded in 1893, colonial administrators (who had been dissatisfied with Lemaire's level of rubber production) replaced him with Fiévez.

Upon assuming the role of commissioner, Fiévez implemented a brutal system of oppression on the native Congolese population—the intent of said policies was to intimidate local peoples into giving food and rubber to the Free State as tribute. As part of this campaign, Fiévez and his forces (consisting of Force Publique enforcers and friendly Congolese tribesmen) forcibly requisitioned food from native Congolese, destroyed crops to cause famine, and carried out massacres to exterminate Congolese who resisted the Free State. Villages that were unwilling or unable to provide food or rubber were looted and burned. Most infamously Fiévez, who was under orders to expend as little ammunition as possible, mandated that his soldiers and allies provide him with the severed hands of slain enemies to show that they had not wasted ammunition. According to oral tradition, such actions led to Fiévez being described as "the devil of the Equator" and nicknamed "Ntange" (roughly translating to "nap" or "bed", as Fiévez was known to nap in the afternoon).

Fiévez's brutal methods took a large toll on Équateur—in late 1894 alone, over 160 villages were burned and looted by his forces with thousands of Congolese being killed or captured for use as forced labourers. His policy suppressed local resistance, allowed for his district to cut costs, and resulted in Équateur producing the most rubber (650 tons) out of any Free State district in 1895—a result which a Free State government source described as "unequalled". However, Fiévez's methods were increasingly seen as overly brutal and as a liability to the Free State; this issue was compounded as word of the atrocities in his district spread and were reported on by British and American missionaries working in the Congo. His position as commissioner was not renewed in 1896 and he returned to Belgium in May of that year. In 1897 he returned to the Congo yet again to become commissioner for Ubangi district, which had previously been abandoned by the Free State authorities.

In 1899, Fiévez was sanctioned by a Free State court for the execution of two men, the deadly assault of another man, and multiple assaults on several women. While this case established the legal precedent that it was illegal for the Free State to employ Congolese as forced labourers, Fiévez himself was acquitted. He returned to Belgium in 1900, dying in 1939.

== See also ==
- Léon Rom

== Biographie ==
- A. Lacroix: FIEVEZ (Victor Léon). Biographie Belge d'Outre-Mer. Vol. III. Academie Royale des Sciences d'Outre-Mer. Brussels. 1952. Link. Columns 304-307.
