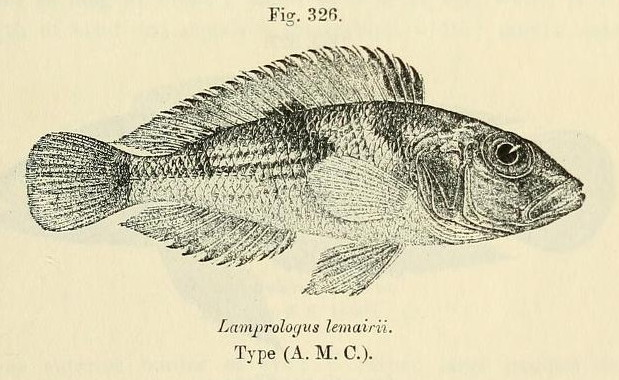

Conservation status
- Least Concern (IUCN 3.1)

Scientific classification
- Kingdom: Animalia
- Phylum: Chordata
- Class: Actinopterygii
- Order: Cichliformes
- Family: Cichlidae
- Genus: Neolamprologus
- Species: N. lemairii

Binomial name
- Neolamprologus lemairii (Boulenger, 1899)

Synonyms
- Lamprologus lemairii

= Neolamprologus lemairii =

Species of fish

Neolamprologus lemairii is a species of cichlid endemic to Lake Tanganyika where it prefers to lurk by rocks or on the lake bed waiting for fish to prey on. This species can reach a length of 25 centimetres (9.8 in) TL. The specific name of this fish honours the leader of the Congo Free State expedition which collected the type, Lieutenant Charles Lemaire (1863-1925).
