= Petit Wasmes =

Village in Belgium

Coordinates: 50°25′N 3°49′E

Petit Wasmes is a hamlet of Wallonia, located in the district of Wasmes, municipality of Colfontaine, province of Hainaut, Belgium. It was once the home of Vincent van Gogh.

== Main sights ==
=== Temple of Petit-Wasmes ===
In the first half of 1800, after recognising freedom of worship to Protestant communities, institutions founded the Union of Evangelical Protestant Churches of the Kingdom of Belgium. Vincent Van Gogh wanted to support pastors in their worshipping, but he never had the chance, since he left Borinage in 1880 and the Temple was only built in 1897.
