= Charles Lemaire (explorer) =

Belgian officer and explorer of Central Africa

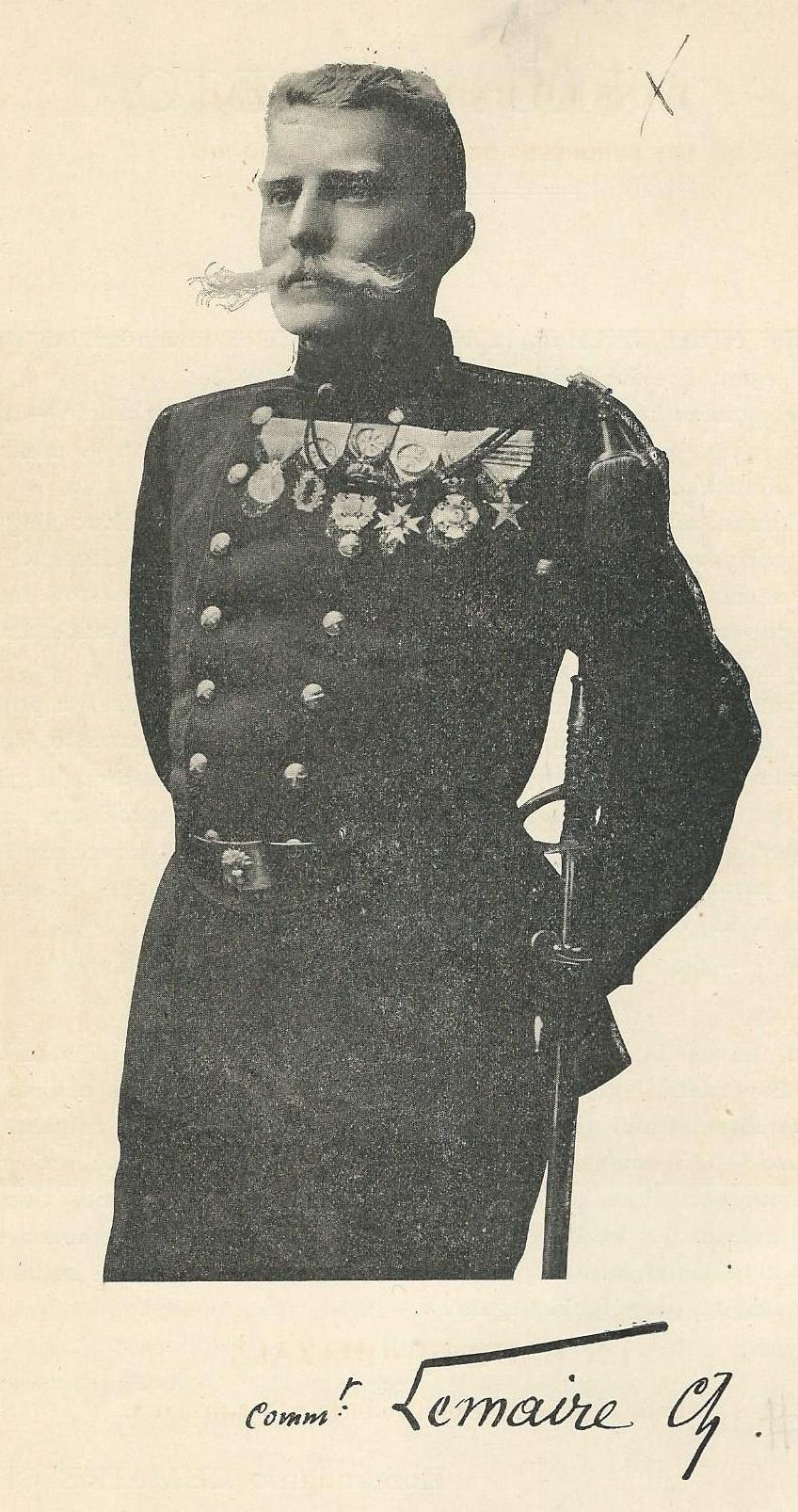
- Lemaire in 1906

Commissioner of Équateur District
- In office 1890–1893
- Succeeded by: Léon Fiévez

Personal details
- Born: 26 March 1863 Cuesmes, Belgium
- Died: 21 January 1926 (aged 62) Brussels, Belgium

Military service
- Allegiance: Congo Free State
- Years of service: 1886-1907
- Rank: Commandant

Charles Lemaire (26 March 1863 – 21 January 1926) was a Belgian officer and explorer of Central Africa. He was known for his voyages of discovery and the detailed reports he wrote of his expeditions and his time as an official in the Congo Free State. Lemaire was also the first director of the Colonial University of Belgium which existed in Antwerp from 1920 to 1962, and was the first true promoter of Esperanto in Belgium.

== Biography ==
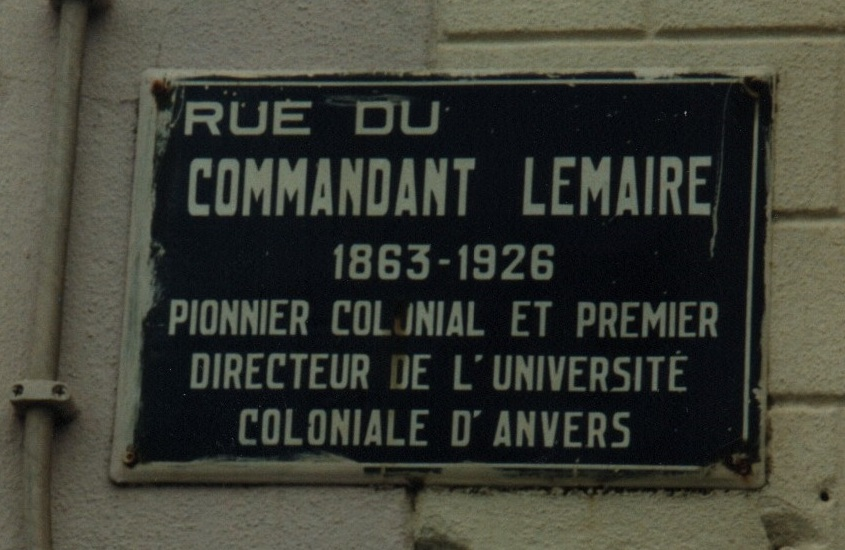
Sign for a street named after Lemaire (Cuesmes, Mons)

Charles Lemaire was born in Cuesmes on 26 March 1863. He attended military school, graduating in 1886 with the rank of second lieutenant. Enlisting in the service of the Congo Free State, he reached Banana in 1889, beginning his career there as deputy to Van Dorpe, Commissioner to the Cataractes District. In this role, he oversaw the shipment of supplies into Léopoldville and lead reconnaissance missions through Kimpese.

=== Commissioner of Équateur ===
Lemaire was appointed as the Commissioner of the Équateur District on 29 November 1890, arriving at his post in December of that year. He formally moved the capital of the district from Equateurville to Coquilhatville, ordering the construction of new post in the area. He ordered expeditions into the region, both to suppress rebellious villages and to scout for areas rich in rubber. While he was ordered to meet certain quotas of rubber harvesting, Lemaire made little effort to do so, citing the lack of proper infrastructure and workers. He had refused to meet the quotas, writing in a letter he had sent to the government “We will have to be cutting off hands, noses, and ears if we intend to collect rubber in the Équateur district (where no preparations had been made). And I don't think we drove away the Arab bandits in order to take their place." In June of 1893, Lemaire was replaced in his role as commissioner by Leon Fiévez, in part due to his failure to meet rubber quotas.

=== Exploration of the Congo ===
Lemaire carried out cartographic work in Katanga between 1898 and 1900. Appointed captain-commander in 1902, he explored Bhar-El-Ghazal with Albert Paulis before returning to Europe in 1905 via the Nile.

Between April and September 1898, Lemaire's expedition was accompanied by photographer and taxidermist François Michel (1855 – 1932). He was in charge of taking photos of the expedition along the way, and building up a natural history collection. Other members of the expedition included caravan leader Justin Maffei, Belgian painter Léon Dardenne, and geologists Jean De Windt and William Caisley. They started at the East African coast, to Moliro and Lake Dilolo, following the Congo River and ending on the west coast of the continent. Apart from a few Europeans, the expedition was made up of hundreds of Africans engaged as porters, laundresses or soldiers.

Accused of abuse towards native soldiers who were guilty of mistreatment of the civilian population, he was demoted and retired in disgrace, before coming out of retirement in 1920 to direct the Colonial University of Belgium. He was elected an associate member of the Académie des sciences coloniales in 1923.

He died in Brussels on 21 January 1926.

== Awards and legacy ==
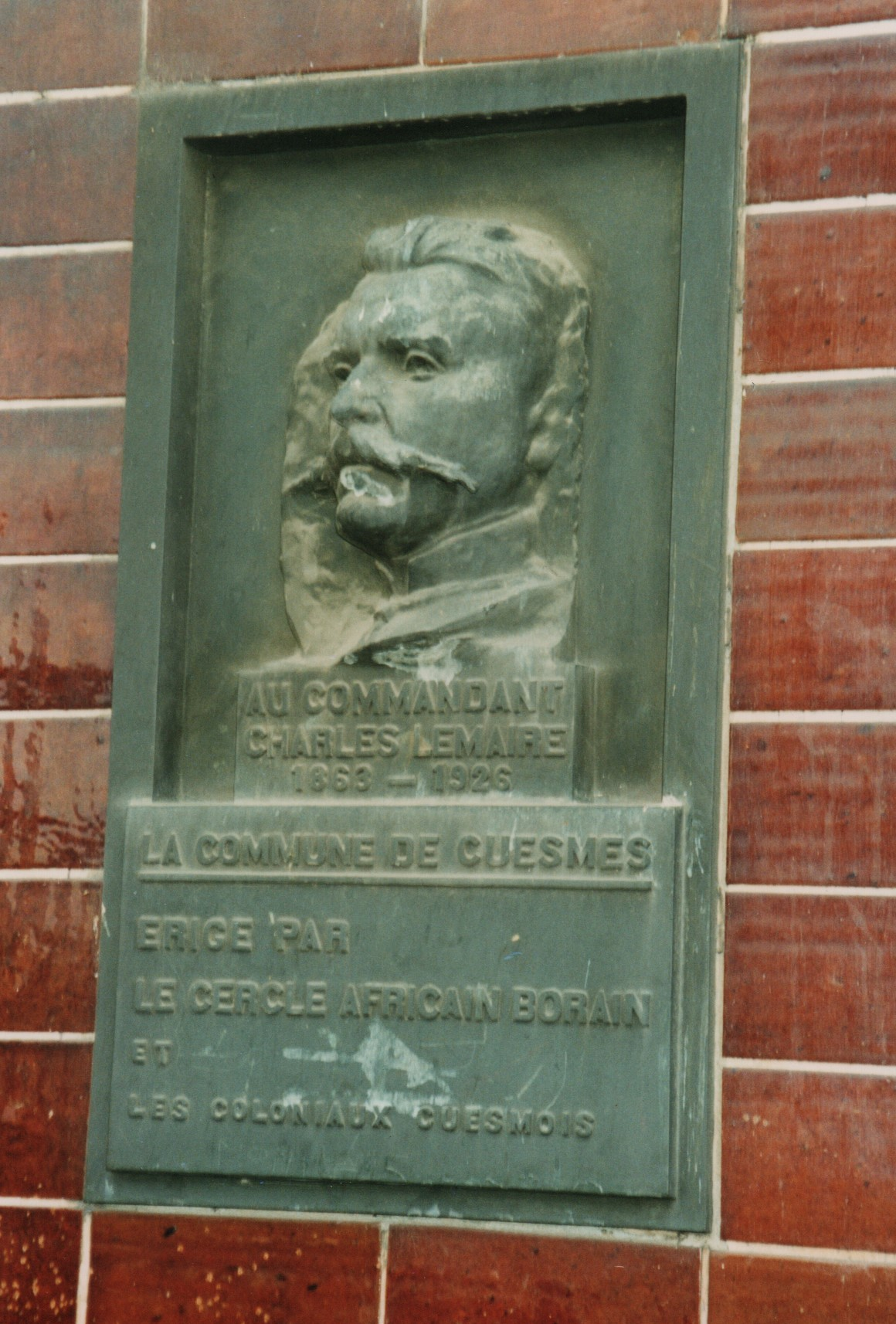
Plaque commemorating 'Au commandant Charles Lemaire', Cuesmes

Lemaire was named an Officer of the Order of Leopold and Commander of the Order of the Crown.

Two species of fish from Lake Tanganyika, Grammatotria lemairii and Lamprologus lemairii, have been named after him. The Lemaire Channel is also named for him.

== Publications ==
- 1894: Congo et Belgique: (à propos de l'Exposition d'Anvers) / par le lieutenant Lemaire, Ch.
- 1895: Au Congo: comment les noirs travaillent, par le lieutenant Lemaire, Ch.
- 1898-1900: Etat indépendant du Congo. Mission scientifique du Ka-Tanga. Itinéraire parcouru du 5 août 1898 au 2 mars 1900 / Observateurs le lieutenant Ch. Lemaire
- 1901: Mission scientifique du Ka-Tanga: résultats des observations astronomiques, magnétiques et altimétriques effectuées sur le territoire de l'État indépendant du Congo / par le capitaine Lemaire, Charles, Bulens éditeur, Bruxelles.
