= Abraham van der Waeyen Pieterszen =

Dutch-born Belgian painter

- Born: Abraham van der Waeyen Pieterszen; 14 May 1817; Middelburg, Belgium
- Died: 16 April 1880 (aged 62); Sint-Maria-Horebeke, Belgium
- Occupation: Painter

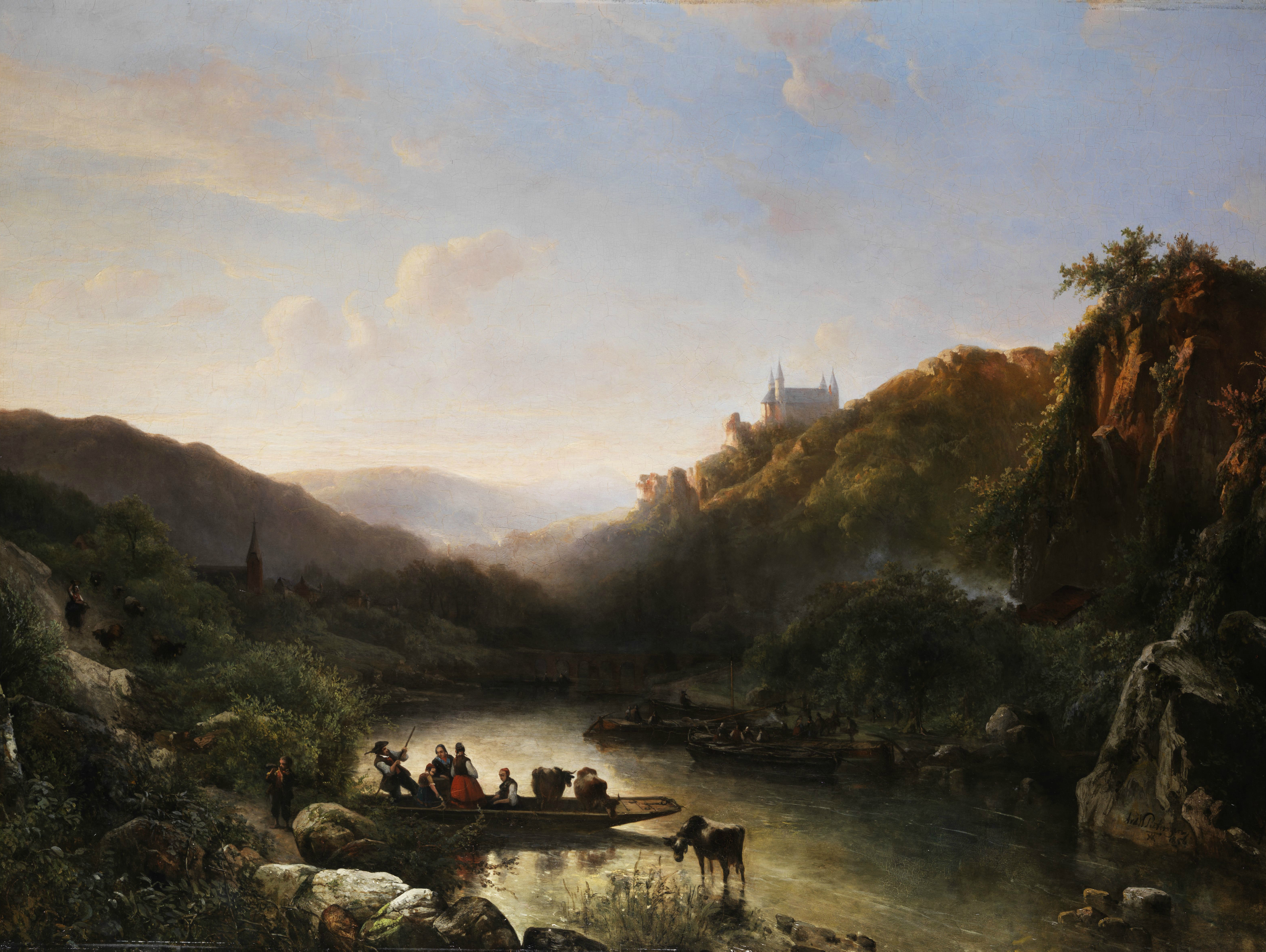
Abraham van der Waeyen Pieterszen, Mountainous riverscape with Romanesque church

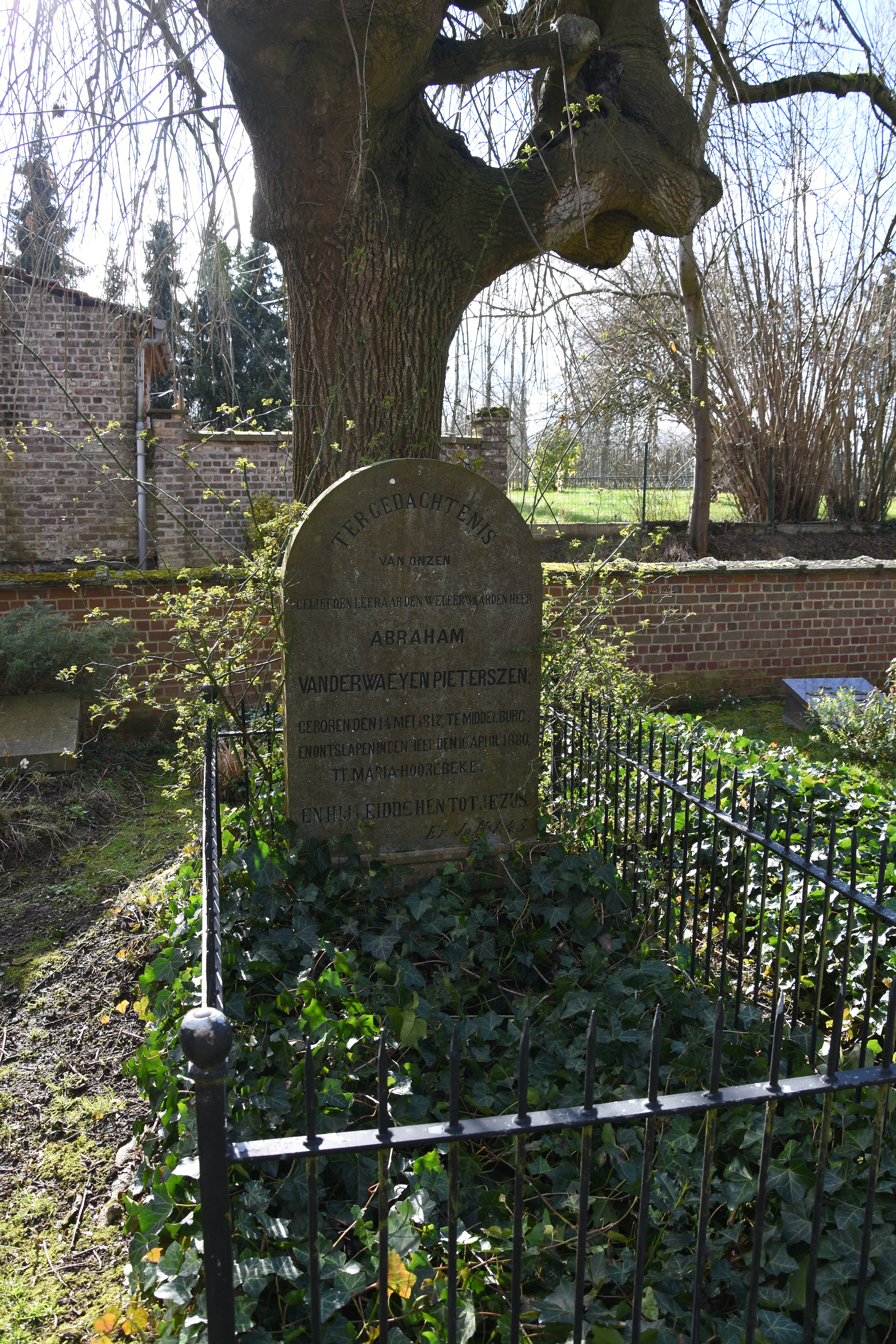
The tomb of Abraham van der Waeyen Pieterszen in Horebeke

Abraham van der Waeyen Pieterszen (14 May 1817 in Middelburg – 16 April 1880 in Sint-Maria-Horebeke) was a Dutch-born painter, trained in Antwerp. From 1844 Pieterszen worked as a deacon, later as a preacher for the Protestant Union of Belgium in Antwerp, Brussels, Mechelen and Leuven, finally in Horebeke. For 22 years, from 1857 to 1877, Pieterszen served as agent-général of the committee of evangelisation (Comitée Synodal d'Evangelisation); from 1860 to 1867 as editor of L'Union, the official paper of the Belgian Protestants, too - but this additional task proved to be too much for him.

Pieterszen was among the six founders and governors of the Evangelical College (Vlaamsche Opleidingsschool) in Laeken, near Brussels, established in 1875 under the direction by N. de Jonge. 16–17 July 1878, Ds. Theodorus van Gogh introduced his eldest son Vincent to the governors, who was admitted for three months on approval; but then he, a Dutch citizen, was told he could not expect to get the conditions of a native Belgium. Van Gogh's request of 26 December 1878, to join the work of the committee, was evidently supported Pieterszen, and so Vincent got a temporary contract for six-month on approval.

Even when the committee headed by Pierre Péron (1828–1920), minister of Dour (1869–1882) and the part of the Borinage district Van Gogh was appointed to, in 1879 refused to extend his contract, Van Gogh still found Pieterszen's door open to discuss his wish to work somewhere between art and religion.

Soon, however, Pieterszen fell ill and died within short, in April 1880, little after Van Gogh's escape back to the Borinage.

== Resources ==
=== References ===
- Lutjeharms, H. J.: Abraham van der Waeyen Pieterszen: Kunstschilder - evangelist - predikant, Bulletin van de Vereeniging voor de Geschiedenis van het Belgisch Protestantisme V, 1969, pp. 131–144
