= Cuesmes =

Sub-municipality of the city of Mons, Belgium

Cuesmes Cweme (Walloon)
- Sub-municipality of Mons
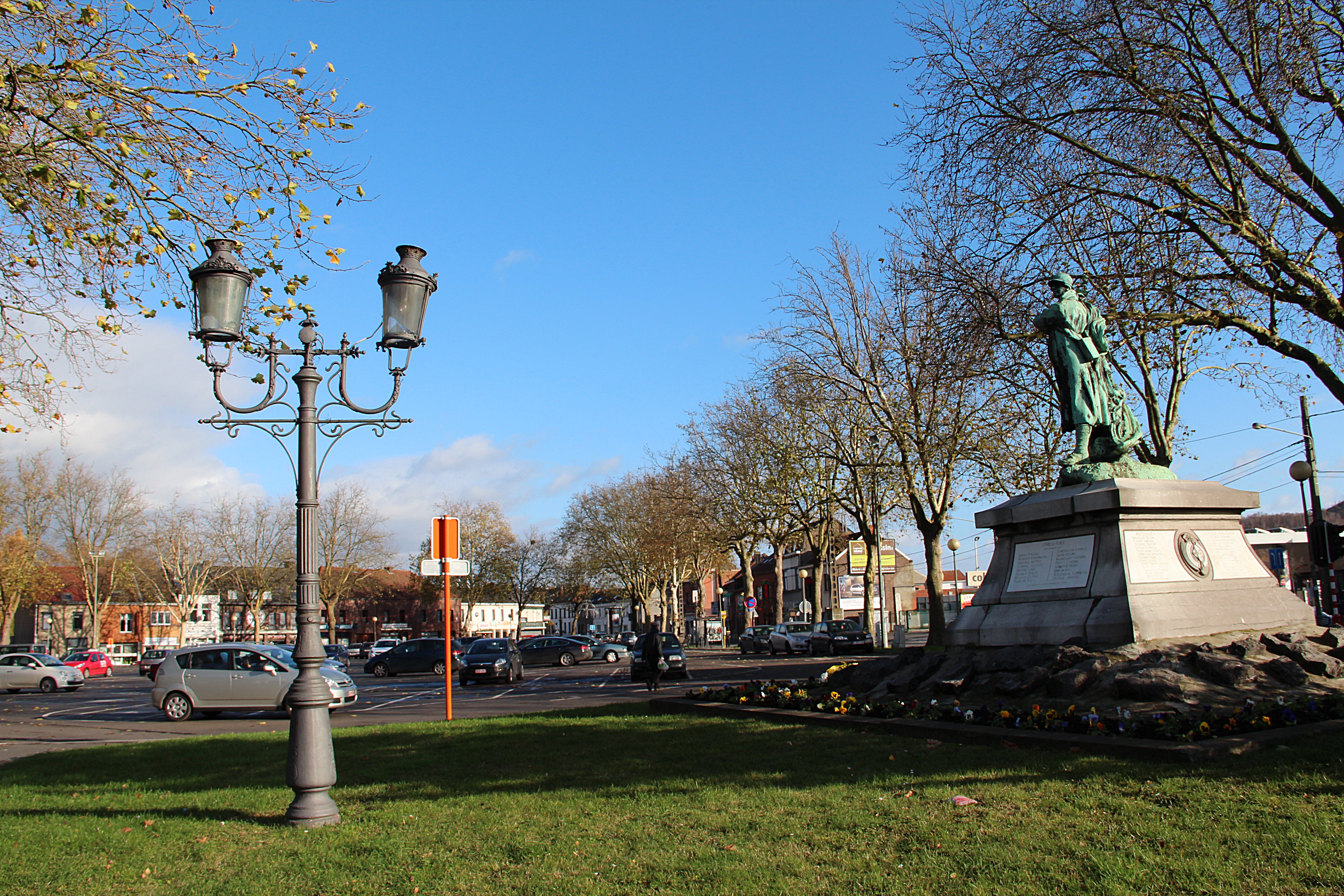
- War memorial

- Coat of arms

- Location of Cuesmes in Mons
- Interactive map of Cuesmes
- Location within Belgium Location within Hainaut (Belgium)
- Coordinates: 50°26′10″N 3°55′14″E
- Country: Belgium
- Community: French Community
- Region: Wallonia
- Province: Hainaut
- Arrondissement: Mons
- Municipality: Mons

Area
  - Total: 9.44 km^{2} (3.64 sq mi)

Population (2020-01-01)
  - Total: 9,964
  - Density: 1,060/km^{2} (2,730/sq mi)
- Postal codes: 7033
- Area codes: 065

Cuesmes (French pronunciation: [kwɛm] or [kɥɛm]; Walloon: Cweme) is a sub-municipality of the city of Mons located in the province of Hainaut, Wallonia, Belgium. It was a separate municipality until 1972. On 1 January 1972, it was merged into Mons.

== History ==
Cuesmes was and originally is a coal mining village, as many of the residents who live there are descendants of coal miners from the 19th and 18th centuries. Coal mining is such a big part of Cuesmes and its culture that the village is surrounded by slag heaps, the most famous being Mount Héribus. Other slag heaps include Terril Du Lavunt, Terril Saint-Joseph, and Terril Sainte-Henriette. Terril Du Lavunt is 2.9 km (1.8 mi) away from Mount Héribus.

=== Cemetery ===
Cuesmes community cemetery is the public graveyard for the village of Cuesmes. The cemetery contains 47 Commonwealth burials of World War I, 9 of which are identified bodies, the rest are unidentifiable. The bodies date from August 1914 to November 1918, and were brought to the cemetery after the Armistice. The cemetery is located 2 km (1.2 mi) west of Mons.

== Geography ==
Cuesmes is surrounded by villages and a city. The city of Mons gives protection from any invaders in the north east of the village, whilst the three towns, Hyon, Mesvin, and Cuesmes, give the village protection from the east. Its neighbouring town, Jemappes, has a road going through the middle of it called 'Rue de Cuesmes', this is because of how close they are together.

As a whole, the village of Cuesmes is surrounded in slag heaps, this is because coal miners would dump large quantities of rock in areas, and they eventually built up into large hills around the mine shafts. When there's not houses or streets, there are large farming fields, and small areas with trees, such as the yard surrounding Maison Van Gogh.

== Notable people ==
- Vincent van Gogh (1853 – 1890), lived here during the years of 1879 and 1880, at Maison Van Gogh (now a museum).
- Charles Lemaire (1863 – 1926), explorer and military officer

== Gallery ==
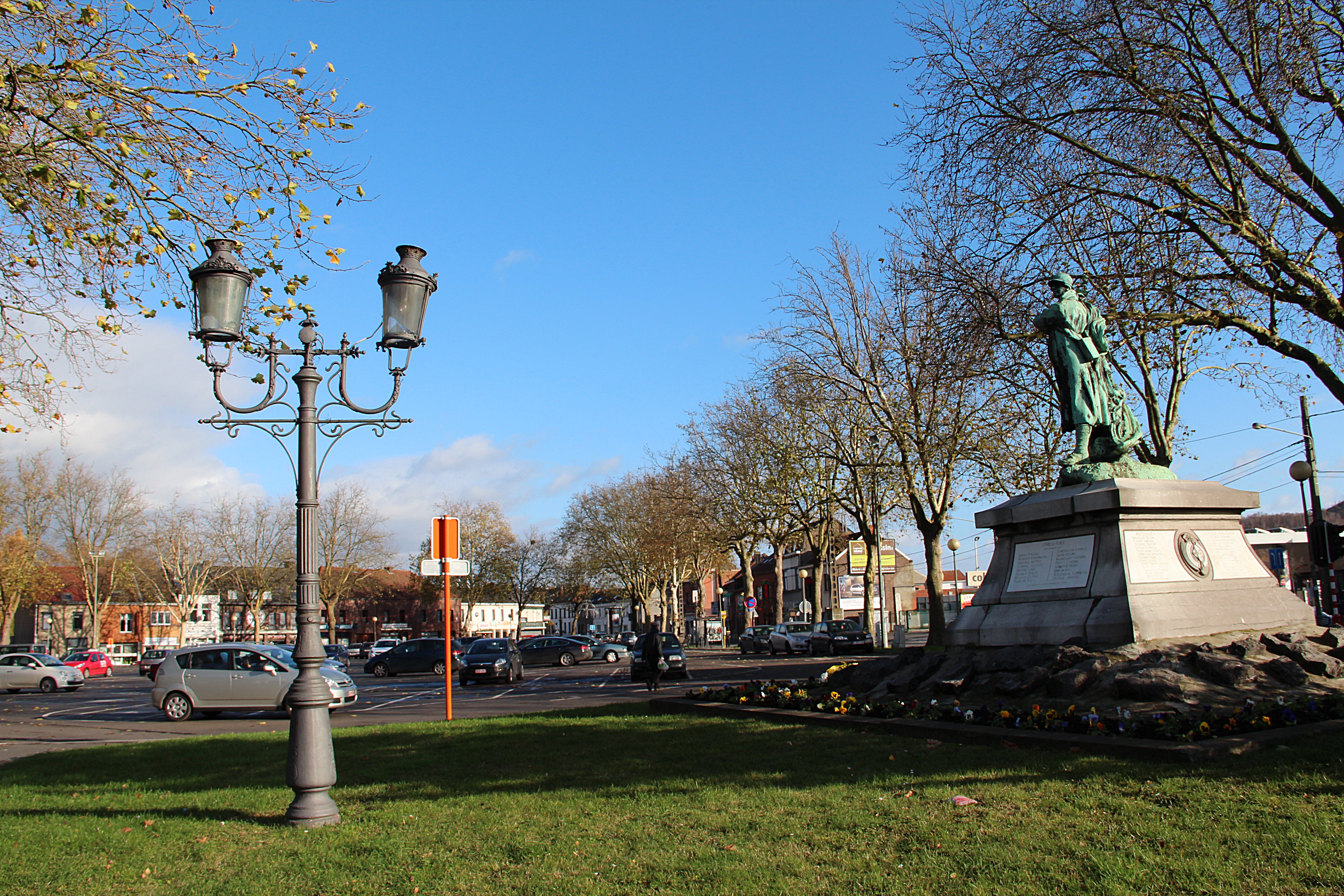
Place (Square) de Cuesmes.

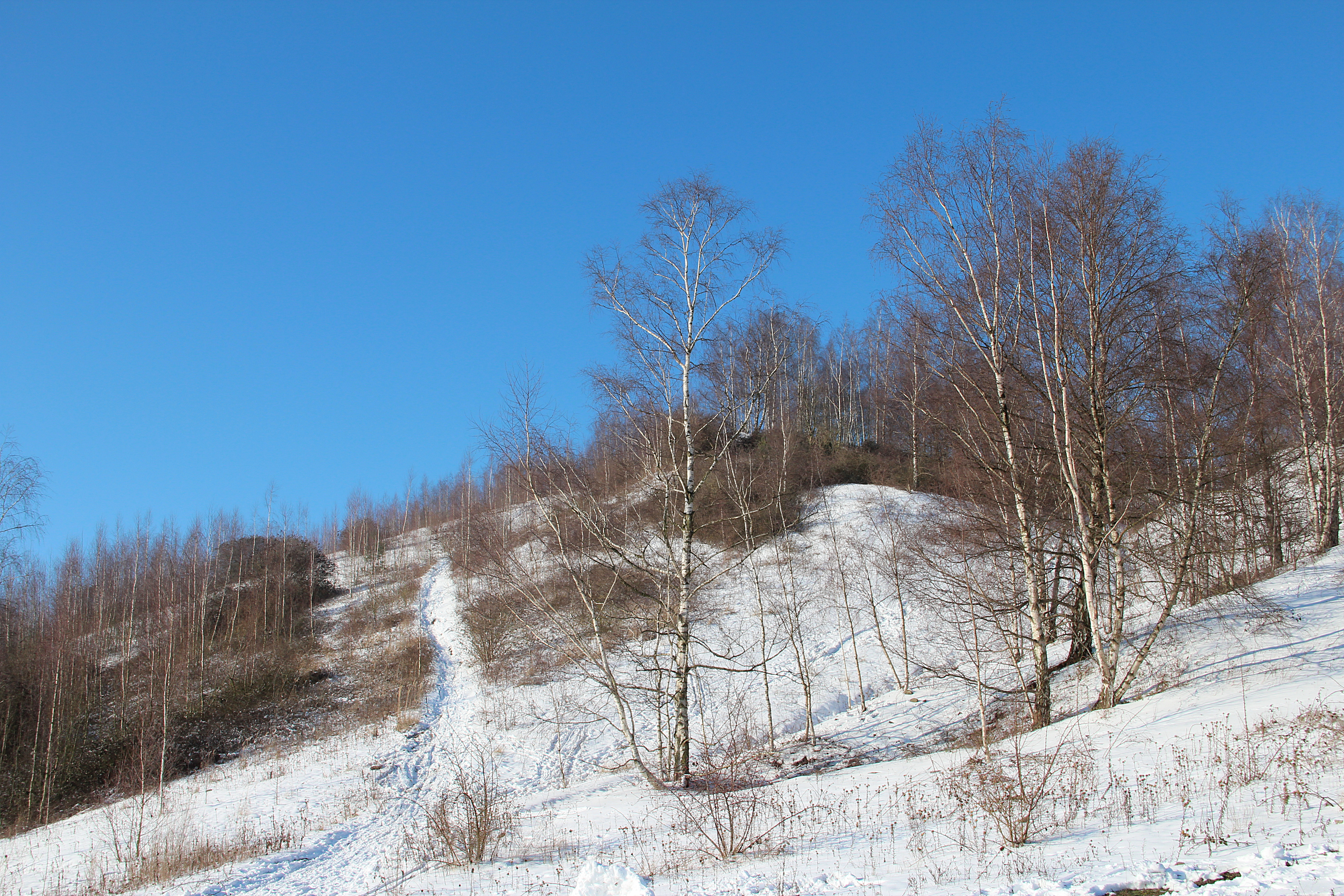
The Mount Héribus.

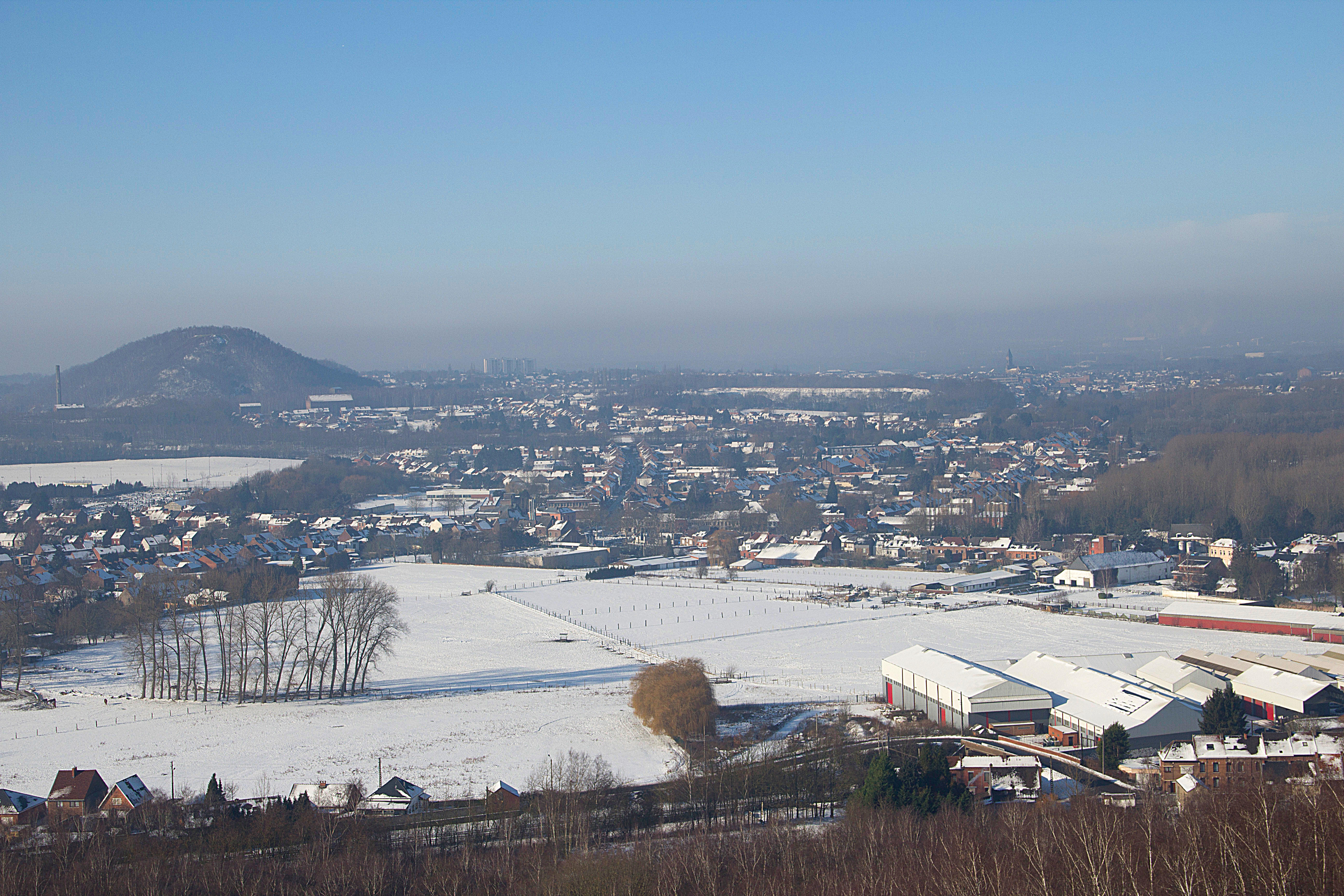
The village seen from the Mount Héribus.

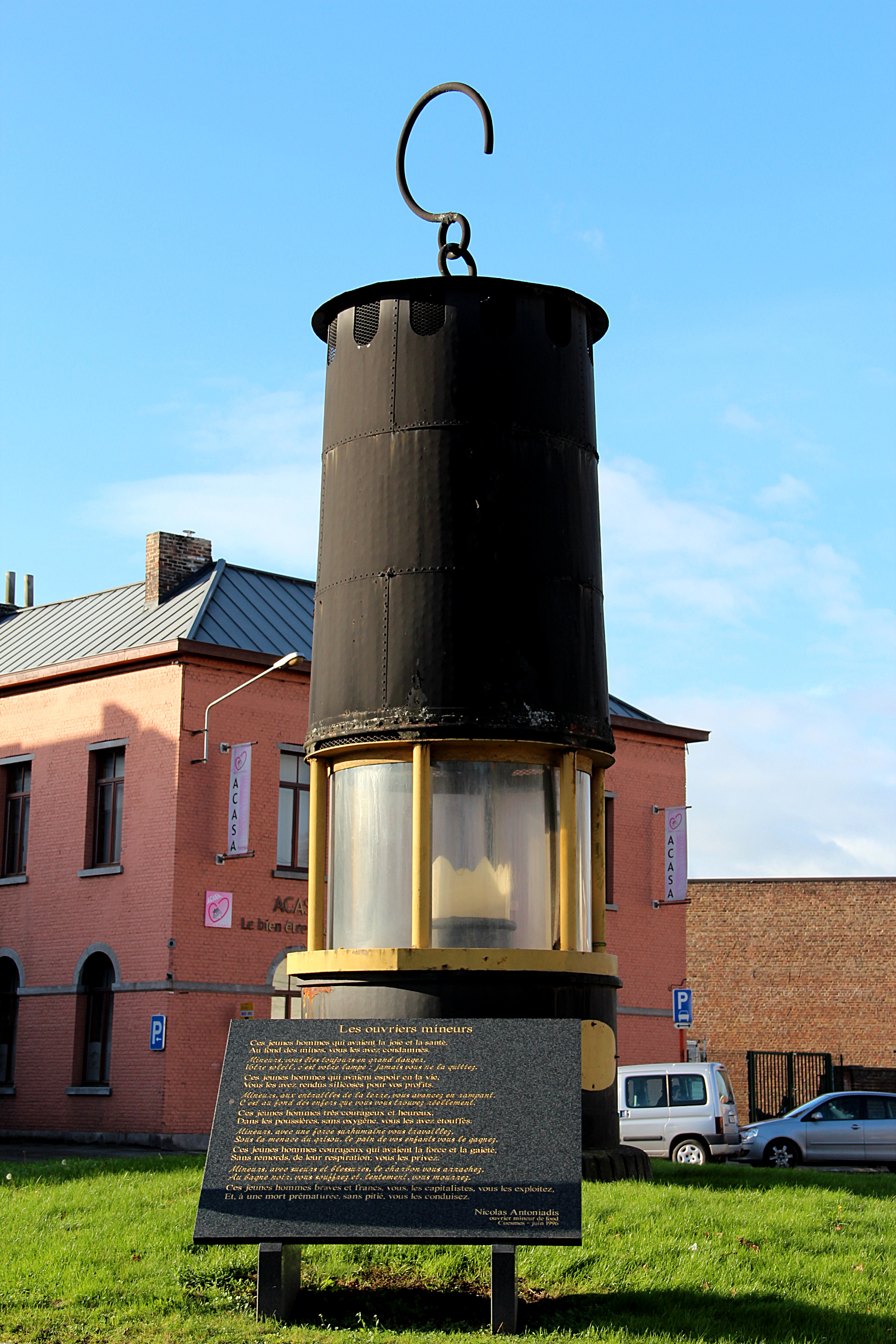
Giant miner's lamp.

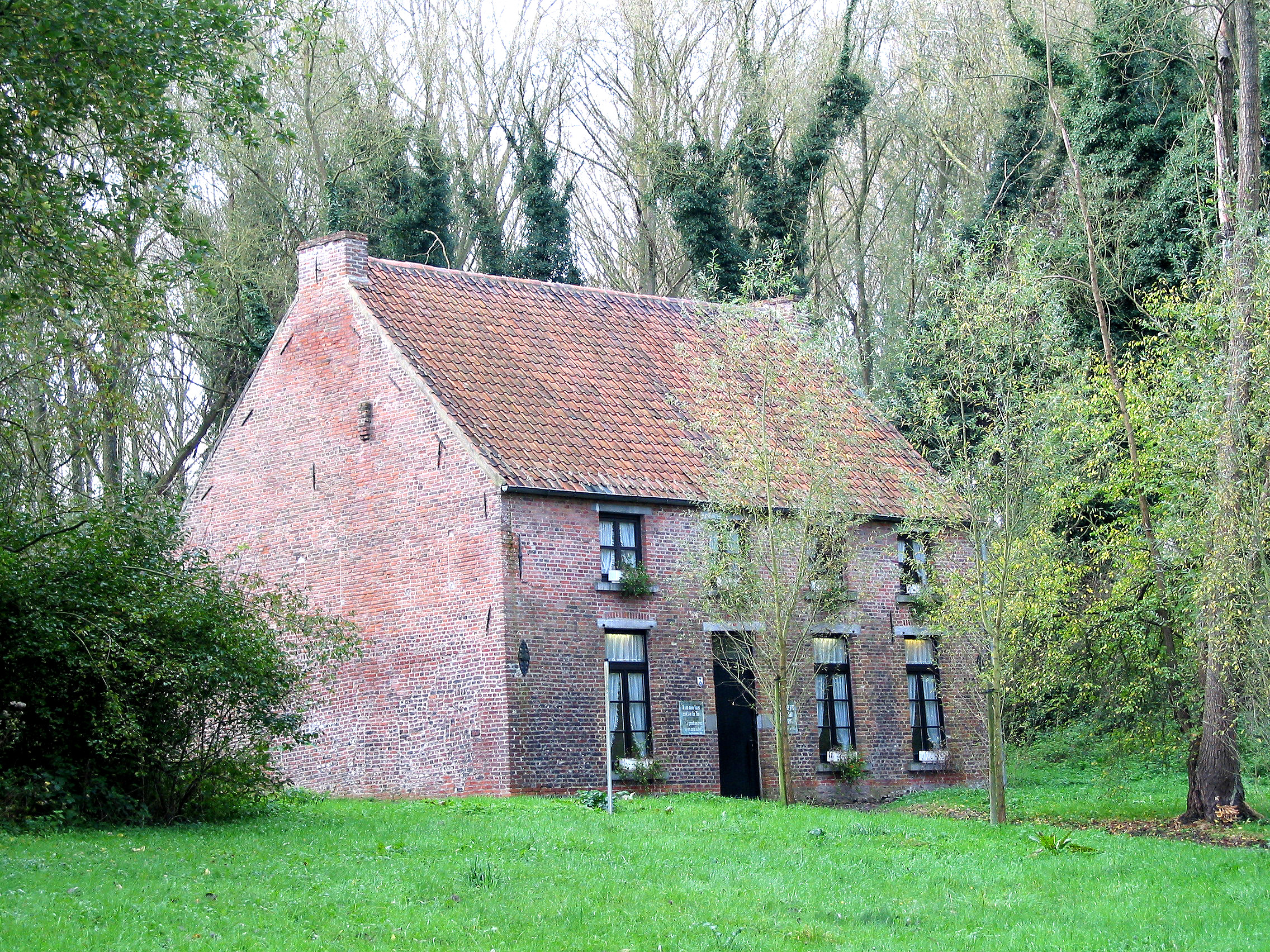
House of Vincent van Gogh.
