= Wasmes =

Wasmes Wame-e-Borinaedje (Walloon)
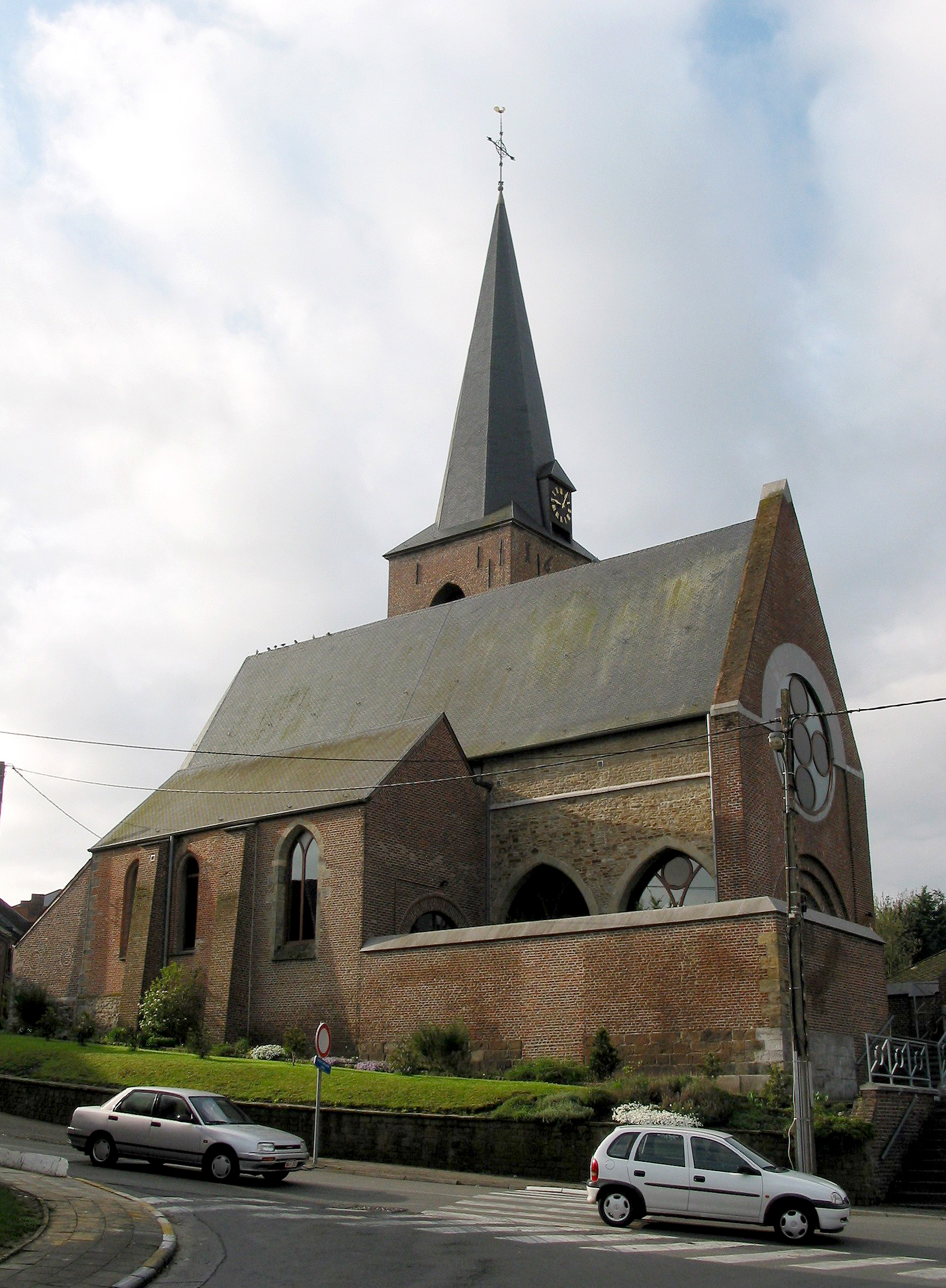
- The church of Our Lady

- Location in Belgium
- Coordinates: 50°25′N 03°50′E
- Country: Belgium
- Region: Wallonia
- Province: Hainaut
- Arrondissement: Mons
- Municipality: Colfontaine

Area
  - Total: 6.87 km^{2} (2.65 sq mi)
- Area codes: 065
- Website: www.colfontaine.be
- Location of Colfontaine in Hainaut

Wasmes (French pronunciation: [wam]; Walloon: Wame-e-Borinaedje) is a village of Wallonia and a district of the municipality of Colfontaine, located in the province of Hainaut, Belgium.

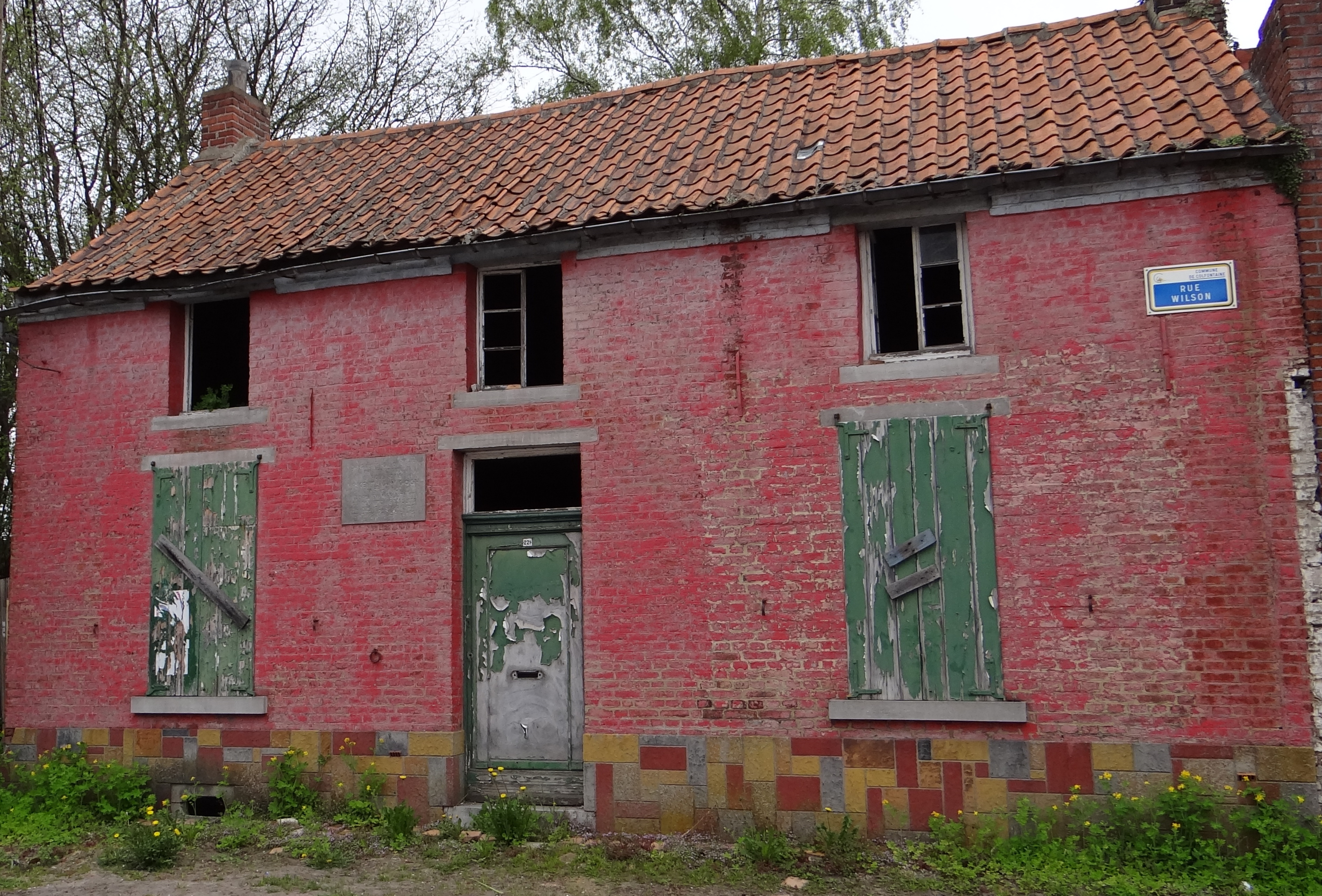
Vincent van Gogh - 1878 1879 - Wasmes - House of baker Denis - Corner street of Petit-Wasmes and street Wilson, before renovation.

In January 1879 Vincent van Gogh temporarily moved to the village, in the hamlet of Petit Wasmes, to take up a post as missionary.
