= List of works by Vincent van Gogh =

This is an incomplete list of paintings and other works by the Dutch artist Vincent van Gogh (1853–1890). Little appreciated during his lifetime, his fame grew in the years after his death. According to the legend, Van Gogh sold only one painting, The Red Vineyard, bought for 400 francs by the painter and art collector Anna Boch. Today, he is widely regarded as one of history's greatest painters and an important contributor to the foundations of modern art. Van Gogh did not begin painting until his late twenties, and most of his best-known works were produced during his final two years. He produced more than 2,000 artworks, consisting of around 900 paintings and 1,100 drawings and sketches. In 2013, Sunset at Montmajour became the first full-sized Van Gogh painting to be newly confirmed since 1928.

Today many of his pieces—including his numerous self portraits, landscapes, portraits and sunflowers—are among the world's most recognizable and expensive works of art. On 30 March 1987, Irises was sold for a record US$53.9 million at Sotheby's; on 15 May 1990, his Portrait of Dr. Gachet was sold for US$82.5 million at Christie's, establishing a new price record until exceeded in 2004 by a Picasso painting.

The Van Gogh Museum in Amsterdam is dedicated to Van Gogh's work and that of his contemporaries. The Kröller-Müller Museum in Otterlo (also in the Netherlands), has another considerable collection of his paintings. The listing is ordered by year and then by catalogue number. While more accurate dating of Van Gogh's work is often difficult, as a general rule, the numbering from Jan Hulsker's catalogue is more precise chronologically.

== Paintings (The Hague-Drenthe) ==
All works listed here are oil on canvas unless otherwise indicated.

†	Denotes paintings auctioned for a record-breaking price.

Image, Title	Date	Current location	Created in	Medium, Dimensions	No.
Still Life with Cabbage and Clogs	November–December 1881	Van Gogh Museum, Amsterdam	The Hague	Oil on paper on panel 34 x 55 cm	F 1 JH 81
Beach at Scheveningen in Calm Weather	August 1882	Minnesota Marine Art Museum, Winona	The Hague	Oil on paper on panel 35.5 x 49.5 cm	F 2 JH 173
Dunes	August 1882	Private collection	The Hague	Oil on panel 36.8 x 59.7 cm	F 2a JH 176
Women Mending Nets in the Dunes	August 1882	Private collection	The Hague	Oil on paper on panel 42 x 62.5 cm	F 7 JH 178
A Girl in the Street, Two Coaches in the Background	August 1882	Villa Flora, Winterthur	The Hague	Oil on canvas on panel 42 x 53 cm	F 13; JH 179
Girl in the Woods	August 1882	Private collection	The Hague	Oil on canvas on panel 34.7 x 47.3 cm	F 8a JH 180
Two Women in the Woods	August 1882	Private collection	The Hague	Oil on paper on panel 35 x 24.5 cm	F 1665; JH 181
Girl in White in the Woods	August 1882	Kröller-Müller Museum, Otterlo	The Hague	39 x 59 cm	F 8 JH 182
Edge of a Wood	August 1882	Kröller-Müller Museum, Otterlo	The Hague	Oil on canvas on panel 34.5 x 49 cm	F 192; JH 184
Man Stooping with Stick or Spade	August 1882	Kubosō Memorial Museum of Arts, Izumi	The Hague	Oil on paper on panel 31 x 29.5 cm	F 12; JH 185
Dunes with Figures	August 1882	Private collection	The Hague	Oil on canvas on panel 24 x 32 cm	F 3 JH 186
Beach at Scheveningen in Stormy Weather	August 1882	Van Gogh Museum, Amsterdam	Scheveningen	34.5 x 21 cm	F 4 JH 187
Fisherman on the Beach	August 1882	Kröller-Müller Museum, Otterlo	The Hague	Oil on canvas on panel 51 x 33.5 cm	F 5 JH 188
Fisherman's Wife on the Beach	August 1882	Kröller-Müller Museum, Otterlo	The Hague	Oil on canvas on panel 52 x 34 cm	F 6 JH 189
Cluster of Old Houses with the New Church in The Hague	August 1882	Private collection	The Hague	Oil on canvas on cardboard 35.5 x 26.2 cm	F 204; JH 190
Bulb Fields	April 1883	National Gallery of Art, Washington D.C.	The Hague	Oil on canvas on panel 48 x 65 cm	F 186; JH 361
Three Figures near a Canal with Windmill	August 1883	Unknown	The Hague	Unknown	F 1666; JH 383
A Wind-Beaten Tree	August 1883	Unknown (stolen)	The Hague	35 x 47 cm	F 10; JH 384
Potato Digging (Five Figures)	August 1883	Private collection	The Hague	39.5 x 94.5 cm	F 9 JH 385
Footbridge across a Ditch	August 1883	Private collection	The Hague	47 x 35 cm	F 189; JH 386
Cows in the Meadow	August 1883	Private collection	The Hague	Oil on canvas on panel 31.5 x 44 cm	F 15; JH 387
Lying Cow	August 1883	Private collection	The Hague	30 x 50 cm	F 1b JH 388
Lying Cow	August 1883	Unknown	The Hague	19 x 47.5 cm	F 1c JH 389
Farmhouses in Loosduinen near The Hague at Twilight	August 1883	Centraal Museum, Utrecht	The Hague	Oil on canvas on panel 33 x 50 cm	F 16; JH 391
The Sower (study)	August 1883	Unknown	The Hague	19 x 27.5 cm	F 11; JH 392
Marshy Landscape	August 1883	Private collection	The Hague	25 x 45.5 cm	JH 394
Landscape with Dunes	September 1883	Private collection	The Hague	Oil on paper on panel 33.5 x 48.5 cm	F 15a JH 393
Cottages	September 1883	Van Gogh Museum, Amsterdam	Nieuw-Amsterdam	35.5 x 55.5 cm	F 17; JH 395
Farmhouses Among Trees	September 1883	Museum of John Paul II Collection, Warsaw	The Hague	Oil on canvas on panel 28.5 x 39.5 cm	F 18; JH 397
Two Women in the Moor	October 1883	Van Gogh Museum, Amsterdam	Nieuw-Amsterdam	27.8 x 36.5 cm	F 19; JH 409
Landscape with a Church at Twilight	October 1883	Private collection	Drenthe	Oil on cardboard on panel 36 x 53 cm	F 188; JH 413
Peat Boat with Two Figures	October 1883	Drents Museum, Assen	Drenthe	Oil on canvas on panel 37 x 55.5 cm	F 21; JH 415
Peasant Burning Weeds	October 1883	Drents Museum, Assen and Van Gogh Museum, Amsterdam	Drenthe	Oil on canvas on panel 30.5 x 39.7 cm	F 20; JH 417
Farm with Stacks of Peat	November 1883	Van Gogh Museum, Amsterdam	Nieuw-Amsterdam	37.5 x 55 cm	F 22; JH 421

== Paintings (Nuenen-Antwerp) ==
Image, Title	Date	Current location	Created in	Medium, Dimensions	No.
Weaver Facing Right (Half-Figure)	January 1884	Private Collection	Nuenen	48 x 46 cm	F 26; JH 450
Weaver Facing Right	February 1884	Private Collection	Nuenen	Oil on canvas on panel 36.6 x 45 cm	F 162; JH 457
The Old Tower at Nuenen with a Ploughman	February 1884	Kröller-Müller Museum, Otterlo	Nuenen	34.5 x 42 cm	F 34; JH 459
Weaver Facing Left with Spinning Wheel	March 1884	Museum of Fine Arts, Boston	Nuenen	61 x 85 cm	F 29; JH 471
Weaver Arranging Threads	April–May 1884	Kröller-Müller Museum, Otterlo	Nuenen	Oil on canvas on panel 41 x 57 cm	F 35; JH 478
Landscape with Pollard Willows	May 1884	Private collection	Nuenen	Oil on canvas on panel 42.8 x 58.6 cm	F 31; JH 477
The Old Tower of Nuenen with People Walking	May 1884	Private collection	Nuenen	Oil on canvas on panel 33.5 x 44 cm	F 184; JH 458
Loom with Weaver	May 1884	Kröller-Müller Museum, Otterlo	Nuenen	70 x 85 cm	F 30; JH 479
Weaver Standing in Front of a Loom	May 1884	Private collection	Nuenen	Oil on panel 19 x 41 cm	F 32; JH 480
The Parsonage Garden at Nuenen	May 1884	Groninger Museum, Groningen	Nuenen	Oil on paper on panel 25 x 57 cm	F 185; JH 484
Water Mill at Kollen Near Nuenen	May 1884	Noordbrabants Museum, 's-Hertogenbosch	Nuenen	Oil on canvas on cardboard 60.5 x 80 cm	F 48a JH 488
Weaver Standing in Front of a Loom	May 1884	Private collection	Nuenen	55 x 79 cm	F 33; JH 489
The Old Church Tower at Nuenen	May 1884	Foundation E.G. Bührle, Zürich	Nuenen	Oil on canvas on panel 47.5 x 55 cm	F 88; JH 490
Weaver, Nearer an Open Windows	July 1884	Neue Pinakothek, Munich	Nuenen	67.7 x 93.2 cm	F 24; JH 500
Weaver, Interior with Three Small Windows	July 1884	Kröller-Müller Museum, Otterlo	Nuenen	61 x 93 cm	F 37; JH 501
Weaver, Seen from the Front	July 1884	Museum Boijmans Van Beuningen, Rotterdam	Nuenen	Oil on canvas on panel 47 x 61.3 cm	F 27; JH 503
Cart with Red and White Ox	July 1884	Kröller-Müller Museum, Otterlo	Nuenen	Oil on canvas on panel 57 x 82.5 cm	F 38; JH 504
Cart with Black Ox	July 1884	Portland Art Museum, Portland	Nuenen	60 x 80 cm	F 39; JH 505
The Old Tower in the Fields	July 1884	Private collection	Nuenen	35 x 47 cm	F 40; JH 507
Village at Sunset	Summer 1884	Rijksmuseum, Amsterdam	Nuenen	Oil on paper on cardboard 57 x 82 cm	F 190; JH 492
Farmers Planting Potatoes	August–September 1884	Kröller-Müller Museum, Otterlo	Nuenen	66 x 149 cm	F 41; JH 513
Potato Planting	September 1884	Von der Heydt Museum, Wuppertal	Nuenen	70.5 x 170 cm	F 172; JH 514
Wood Gatherers in the Snow	September 1884	Private collection	Nuenen	Oil on canvas on panel 67 x 126 cm	F 43; JH 516
Shepherd with a Flock of Sheep	September 1884	Museo Soumaya, Mexico City	Nuenen	Oil on canvas on cardboard 67 x 126 cm	F 42; JH 517
Avenue of Poplars at Sunset	October 1884	Kröller-Müller Museum, Otterlo	Nuenen	45.5 x 32.5 cm	F 123; JH 518
Lane in Autumn	October 1884	Private collection	Nuenen	Oil on canvas on panel 46 x 35 cm	F 120; JH 519
Avenue of Poplars in Autumn	Late October 1884	Van Gogh Museum, Amsterdam	Nuenen	Oil on canvas on panel 99 x 66 cm	F 122; JH 522
Congregation Leaving the Reformed Church in Nuenen	1884–85	Van Gogh Museum, Amsterdam	Nuenen	41.3 x 32.1 cm	F 25; JH 521
Vase with Honesty	Autumn-Winter 1884–85	Van Gogh Museum, Amsterdam	Nuenen	42.7 x 31.7 cm	F 76; JH 542
Water Mill at Gennep	November 1884	Noordbrabants Museum, 's-Hertogenbosch	Nuenen	60 x 78.5 cm	F 46; JH 524
Water Mill at Gennep	November 1884	Museo Thyssen-Bornemisza, Madrid	Nuenen	85 x 151 cm	F 125; JH 525
Water Mill at Gennep	November 1884	Private collection	Nuenen	Oil on cardboard 75 x 100 cm	F 1144a JH 523
Water Mill at Opwetten	November 1884	Private collection	Nuenen	Oil on canvas on panel 45 x 58 cm	F 48; JH 527
Still Life with Pots, Jar and Bottles	November 1884	Gemeentemuseum Den Haag, The Hague	Nuenen	29.5 x 39.5 cm	F 178r JH 528
Still Life with Four Stone Bottles, Flask and White Cup	November 1884	Kröller-Müller Museum, Otterlo	Nuenen	33 x 41 cm	F 50; JH 529
Still Life with Five Bottles	November 1884	Österreichische Galerie Belvedere, Vienna	Nuenen	46.5 x 56 cm	F 56; JH 530
Still Life with Pottery, Beer Glass and Bottle	November 1884	Private collection	Nuenen	Oil on canvas on panel 31 x 41 cm	F 58; JH 531
Still Life with Two Sacks and a Bottle	November 1884	Private collection	Nuenen	Oil on canvas on panel 31.7 x 42 cm	F 55; JH 532
Still Life with Two Sacks and a Bottle	November 1884	Van Gogh Museum, Amsterdam	Nuenen	31.5 x 41.7 cm	F61r; JH 533
Beer Tankards	November 1884	Van Gogh Museum, Amsterdam	Nuenen	31.5 x 42.5 cm	F49; JH 534
Still Life with Coffee Mill, Pipe Case and Jug	November 1884	Kröller-Müller Museum, Otterlo	Nuenen	34 x 43 cm	F 52; JH 535
Still Life with Clogs and Pots	November 1884	Centraal Museum, Utrecht	Nuenen	Oil on canvas on panel 42 x 54 cm	F 54; JH 536
Still Life with Bottles and a Cowrie Shell	November 1884	Noordbrabants Museum, 's-Hertogenbosch	Nuenen	Oil on canvas on panel 31.8 x 41.3 cm	F 64; JH 537
Still Life with Pottery and Two Bottles	November 1884	Norton Simon Museum, Pasadena	Nuenen	40 x 56 cm	F 57; JH 539
Still Life with Paintbrushes in a Pot	November 1884	Private collection	Nuenen	Oil on canvas on panel 31.5 x 41.5 cm	F 60; JH 540
Vase with Dead Leaves	November 1884	Private collection	Nuenen	Oil on canvas on panel 41.5 x 31 cm	F 200; JH 541
Two Rats	November 1884	Private collection	Nuenen	Oil on panel 29.5 x 41.5 cm	F 177; JH 543
Peasant Woman, Seated with White Cap	December 1884	Morohashi Museum of Modern Art, Kitashiobara	Nuenen	Oil on canvas on panel 40 x 28.6 cm	F 143; JH 546
Head of a Peasant Woman with Dark Cap	December 1884	Private collection	Nuenen	Oil on canvas panel 35 x 26 cm	F 136a JH 548
Head of an Old Peasant Woman with White Cap	December 1884	Von der Heydt Museum, Wuppertal	Nuenen	36.5 x 29.5 cm	F 75; JH 550
Head of an Old Farmer's Wife in a White Hat	December 1884	Private collection	Nuenen	Oil on canvas cardboard 33 x 26 cm	F 146; JH 551
Head of a Peasant Woman with White Cap	December 1884	Private collection	Nuenen	Oil on canvas panel 40.5 x 30.5 cm	F 144; JH 561
Head of a Peasant with Cap	December 1884	Art Gallery of New South Wales, Sydney	Nuenen	39.4 x 30.2 cm	F 160a JH 563
Head of a Peasant Woman with Cap	December 1884	Saint Louis Art Museum	Nuenen	43.5 x 37 cm	F 146a JH 565
Head of a Peasant Woman	December 1884	Private collection	Nuenen	Oil on canvas on panel 40 x 32.5 cm	F 132; JH 574
Head of a Woman	1884–85	Van Gogh Museum, Amsterdam	Nuenen	Oil on canvas on panel 47.8 x 34.8 cm	F 159
Still Life with Earthenware and Bottles	1884–85	Van Gogh Museum, Amsterdam	Nuenen	40 x 50 cm	F 53; JH 538
Head of a Man	1884–85	Van Gogh Museum, Amsterdam	Nuenen	37.7 x 29.5 cm	F 164; JH 558
Head of a Woman	1884–85	Van Gogh Museum, Amsterdam	Nuenen	42 x 33.3 cm	F 156; JH 569
Head of a Peasant with Cap	January 1885	Collection Niarchos	Nuenen	35.5 x 26 cm	F 169a JH 583
Head of a Peasant Woman	January 1885	Cincinnati Art Museum	Nuenen	Oil on canvas on panel 37.5 x 24.5 cm	F 135; JH 585
Head of a Peasant Woman with Dark Cap	January 1885	Private collection	Nuenen	Oil on canvas on panel 25.4 x 19.1 cm	F 153a JH 586
Head of a Woman	January 1885	Kröller-Müller Museum, Otterlo	Nuenen	Oil on canvas on panel 26 x 20 cm	F 153; JH 587
Head of a Peasant Woman	January 1885	National Gallery, London	Nuenen	40 x 30.5 cm	F 137; JH 593
The Old Cemetery Tower at Nuenen in the Snow	January 1885	Collection Niarchos	Nuenen	Oil on canvas on cardboard 30 x 41.5 cm	F 87; JH 600
The Old Station at Eindhoven	January 1885	Private collection	Nuenen	13.5 x 24 cm	F 67a JH 602
The Parsonage Garden at Nuenen in the Snow	January 1885	Norton Simon Museum, Pasadena	Nuenen	Oil on canvas on panel 51 x 77 cm	F 194; JH 603
The Parsonage Garden at Nuenen in the Snow	January 1885	Hammer Museum, Los Angeles	Nuenen	Oil on canvas on panel 53 x 78 cm	F 67; JH 604
Head of a Peasant Woman with Brownish Cap	January 1885	Kröller-Müller Museum, Otterlo	Nuenen	40 x 30 cm	F 154; JH 608
Head of a Peasant Woman with White Cap	January 1885	Unknown	Nuenen	38 x 30 cm	F 65; JH 627
Head of a Peasant Woman with Dark Cap	January 1885	Private collection	Nuenen	40.6 x 31.7 cm	F 1667; JH 629
Head of a Peasant with a Pipe	January 1885	Kröller-Müller Museum, Otterlo	Nuenen	44 x 32 cm	F 169; JH 633
Head of a Woman	January 1885	Kröller-Müller Museum, Otterlo	Nuenen	36 x 25.5 cm	F 151; JH 649
Head of a Peasant Woman with Dark Cap	February 1885	Noordbrabants Museum, 's-Hertogenbosch	Nuenen	40.1 x 29.6 cm	F 133; JH 584
Head of a Peasant Woman with Dark Cap	February 1885	Hecht Museum, Haifa	Nuenen	32 x 24.5 cm	F 138; JH 644
Peasant Woman, Seated (Half-Figure)	February 1885	Private collection	Nuenen	Oil on canvas on panel 46 x 27 cm	F 127; JH 651
Peasant Woman Peeling Potatoes	February 1885	Private collection	Nuenen	Oil on canvas on panel 43 x 31 cm	F 145; JH 653
The Potato Peeler	February 1885	Metropolitan Museum of Art, New York	Nuenen	41 x 31.5 cm	F 365r JH 654
Peasant Woman Sewing	February 1885	Private collection	Nuenen	42.5 x 33 cm	F 126a JH 655
Peasant Making a Basket	February 1885	Private collection	Nuenen	41 x 33 cm	F 171a JH 657
Peasant Making a Basket	February 1885	Musée des Beaux-Arts, La Chaux-de-Fonds	Nuenen	41 x 33 cm	F 171; JH 658
Head of a Peasant	February–March 1885	Kröller-Müller Museum, Otterlo	Nuenen	47 x 30 cm	F 168; JH 632
Head of a Peasant Woman with Greenish Lace Cap	February–March 1885	Kröller-Müller Museum, Otterlo	Nuenen	Oil on canvas on panel 38 x 28.5 cm	F 74; JH 648
Head of a Young Peasant Woman with Dark Cap	February–March 1885	Kröller-Müller Museum, Otterlo	Nuenen	39 x 26 cm	F 150; JH 650
Peasant Woman Sweeping the Floor	February–March 1885	Kröller-Müller Museum, Otterlo	Nuenen	41 x 27 cm	F 152; JH 656
Peasant Woman Taking her Meal	February–March 1885	Kröller-Müller Museum, Otterlo	Nuenen	42 x 29 cm	F 72; JH 718
Head of a Peasant Woman with White Cap	March 1885	Foundation E.G. Bührle, Zürich	Nuenen	Oil on canvas on panel 41 x 31.5 cm	F 80; JH 681
Head of a Woman	March 1885	Van Gogh Museum, Amsterdam	Nuenen	Oil on canvas marouflagued on triplex 42.2 x 34.8 cm	F80a; JH 682
Head of a Peasant Woman with Brownish Cap	March 1885	Private collection	Nuenen	Oil on canvas on panel 40 x 30 cm	F 136; JH 683
Head of a Peasant Woman with Dark Cap	March 1885	Musée d'Orsay, Paris	Nuenen	Oil on canvas on panel 38.5 x 26.5 cm	F 134; JH 684
Head of a Peasant Woman with White Cap	March 1885	Wood One Museum of Art, Hatsukaichi	Nuenen	Oil on canvas on panel 41 x 35 cm	F 131; JH 685
Head of a Young Peasant with a Peaked Cap	March 1885	Royal Museums of Fine Arts of Belgium, Brussels	Nuenen	39 x 30.5 cm	F 163; JH 687
Head of a Young Peasant with a Peaked Cap	March 1885	Nelson-Atkins Museum of Art, Kansas City	Nuenen	Oil on panel 44.5 x 33.5 cm	F 165; JH 688
Peasant Woman with Child on Her Lap	March 1885	Private collection	Nuenen	Oil on canvas 43.3 x 34.5 cm	F 149; JH 690
Gordinad de Groot, Hedad	March 1885	Private collection	Nuenen	Oil on canvas on panel 41.3 x 32.6 cm	F 1668; JH 691
Head of a Woman	March 1885	Van Gogh Museum, Amsterdam	Nuenen	42.7 x 33.5 cm	F130; JH 692
Head of a Peasant Woman with White Cap	March 1885	Norton Simon Museum, Pasadena	Nuenen	Oil on canvas on panel 47 x 34.5 m	F 85a JH 694
Head of a Peasant Woman with White Cap	March 1885	Museum of Fine Arts Bern	Nuenen	Oil on panel 41 x 31.5 cm	F 81; JH 695
Peasant Woman Standing Indoors	March 1885	National Museum of Serbia, Belgrade	Nuenen	Oil on canvas on panel 41 x 26 cm	F 128; JH 697
Woman Winding Yarn	March 1885	Van Gogh Museum, Amsterdam	Nuenen	40.5 x 31.7 cm	F36; JH 698
Head of a Peasant Woman with White Cap	March 1885	Noordbrabants Museum, 's-Hertogenbosch	Nuenen	Oil on canvas on panel 36 x 27 cm	F 144a JH 704
Peasant Woman Darning Stockings	March 1885	Private collection	Nuenen	Oil on canvas on panel 28.5 x 18.5 cm	F 157; JH 712
Peasant Woman, Seen against the Window	March 1885	Private collection	Nuenen	Oil on canvas on cardboard 41 x 32 cm	F 70; JH 715
Head of a Woman	March 1885	Van Gogh Museum, Amsterdam	Nuenen	38.8 x 31.3 cm	F70a; JH 716
Peasant Woman Seated before an Open Window Peeling Pototoes	March 1885	Private collection	Nuenen	Oil on canvas on panel 36.5 x 25 cm	F 73; JH 717
Head of a Woman	March 1885	Van Gogh Museum, Amsterdam	Nuenen	43 x 30 cm	F160; JH 722
Bobbin Winder	March–April 1885	Van Gogh Museum, Amsterdam	Nuenen	34 x 44.3 cm	F175; JH 497
Peasant Sitting at Table	March–April 1885	Kröller-Müller Museum, Otterlo	Nuenen	44 x 32.5 cm	F 167; JH 689
Head of a Peasant Woman with White Cap	March–April 1885	Kröller-Müller Museum, Otterlo	Nuenen	44 x 36 cm	F 85; JH 693
Woman Sewing	March–April 1885	Van Gogh Museum, Amsterdam	Nuenen	43.2 x 34.2 cm	F 71; JH 719
Study for the Potato Eaters	April 1885	Van Gogh Museum, Amsterdam	Nuenen	43.2 x 34.2 cm	F 77r JH 686
Peasant and Peasant Woman Planting Potatoes	April 1885	Kunsthaus Zürich	Nuenen	33 x 41 cm	F 129a JH 727
The Potato Eaters	April 1885	Kröller-Müller Museum, Otterlo	Nuenen	Oil on canvas on panel 72 x 93 cm	F 78; JH 734
Still Life with Copper Coffeepot and Two White Bowls	April 1885	Private collection	Nuenen	23 x 34 cm	F 202; JH 738
Two Hands	April 1885	Private collection	Nuenen	Oil on canvas on panel 29.5 x 19 cm	F 66; JH 743
Head of a Peasant Woman with White Cap	April 1885	Scottish National Gallery, Edinburgh	Nuenen	Oil on canvas on cardboard 47.5 x 35.5 cm	F 140; JH 745
Landscape with Church and Houses	April 1885	Los Angeles County Museum of Art, Los Angeles	Nuenen	22 x 37 cm	F 185a JH 761 disputed
Evening Landscape	April 1885	Thyssen-Bornemisza Museum, Madrid	Nuenen	Oil on canvas on cardboard 35 x 43 cm	F 191; JH 762
Landscape at Sunset	April 1885	Private collection	Nuenen	27.5 x 41.5 cm	F 79; JH 763
The Potato Eaters	April 1885	Van Gogh Museum, Amsterdam	Nuenen	82 x 114 cm	F 82; JH 764
Head of a Woman	May 1885	Van Gogh Museum, Amsterdam	Nuenen	43.8 x 30 cm	F 69; JH 724
Head of a Woman	May 1885	Van Gogh Museum, Amsterdam	Nuenen	42.2 x 34.5 cm	F 269r JH 725
Old Church Tower at Nuenen ('The Peasants' Churchyard')	May 1885	Van Gogh Museum, Amsterdam	Nuenen	65 x 88 cm	F 84; JH 772
The Cottage	May 1885	Van Gogh Museum, Amsterdam	Nuenen	65.7 x 79.3 cm	F 83; JH 777
Head of a Woman	May 1885	Van Gogh Museum, Amsterdam	Nuenen	43.5 x 36.2 cm	F 388r JH 782
Gordina de Groot, Head	May 1885	Private collection	Nuenen	41 x 34.5 cm	F 141; JH 783
Head of a Peasant Woman	May 1885	Kröller-Müller Museum, Otterlo	Nuenen	40.5 x 34 cm	F 86; JH 785
Head of a Man	May 1885	Van Gogh Museum, Amsterdam	Nuenen	42.5 x 32 cm	F 179r JH 786
Head of a Peasant Woman in a Green Shawl	May 1885	Museum of Fine Arts of Lyon	Nuenen	45 x 35 cm	F 155; JH 787
Woman with a Mourning Shawl	May 1885	Van Gogh Museum, Amsterdam	Nuenen	45.5 x 33 cm	F 161; JH 788
Peasant Woman by the Fireplace	June 1885	Musée d'Orsay, Paris	Nuenen	Oil on canvas on panel 29.5 x 40 cm	F 158; JH 792
Peasant Woman Cooking by a Fireplace	June 1885	Metropolitan Museum of Art, New York	Nuenen	44 x 38 cm	F 176; JH 799
Peasant Woman Sitting on a Chair	June 1885	Private collection	Nuenen	Oil on panel 34 x 26 cm	F 126; JH 800
Cottage with Peasant Woman Digging	June 1885	Tokyo Fuji Art Museum, Tokyo	Nuenen	Oil on canvas on panel 30.5 x 40 cm	F 89; JH 803
Cottage with Trees	June 1885	Wallraf–Richartz Museum, Cologne	Nuenen	Oil on canvas on panel 32 x 46 cm	F 93; JH 805
Cottage with Trees	June 1885	Private collection	Nuenen	24.5 x 35.4 cm	F 92a JH 806
Peasant Woman Digging in Front Her Cottage	June 1885	Art Institute of Chicago	Nuenen	Oil on canvas on cardboard 31.3 x 42 cm	F 142; JH 807
Cottage with Trees and Peasant Woman	June 1885	Private collection	Nuenen	47.5 x 46 cm	F 187; JH 808
Cottage	June 1885	Private collection	Nuenen	35.5 x 67 cm	F 91; JH 809
Cottage with Trees	June 1885	Private collection	Nuenen	44 x 59.5 cm	F 92; JH 810
Cottage and Woman with Goat	June–July 1885	Städel Museum, Frankfurt	Nuenen	60 x 85 cm	F 90; JH 823
Cottage	June–July 1885	Private collection	Nuenen	33 x 43 cm	JH Add.23
Cottage with Peasant Woman Coming Home	July 1885	Museo Soumaya, Mexico City	Nuenen	63.5 x 76 cm	F 170; JH 824
Cottage with Decrepit Barn and Stooping Woman	July 1885	Private collection	Nuenen	62 x 113 cm	F 1669; JH 825
Peasant Woman Digging or Woman with a Spade, Seen from Behind,	July 1885	Art Gallery of Ontario, Toronto	Nuenen	Oil on canvas on panel 41.5 x 32 cm	F 95; JH 827
Two Peasant Woman Digging	July 1885	Private collection	Nuenen	39 x 55 cm	F 96; JH 878
Peasant Digging	July–August 1885	Kröller-Müller Museum, Otterlo	Nuenen	45.5 x 31.5 cm	F 166; JH 850
Peasant Woman Digging	July–August 1885	Noordbrabants Museum, 's-Hertogenbosch	Nuenen	Oil on canvas on panel 37.5 x 25.7 cm	F 94; JH 893
Two Peasant Woman Digging Potatoes	August 1885	Kröller-Müller Museum, Otterlo	Nuenen	Oil on canvas on panel 31.5 x 42.5 cm	F 97/129; JH 876
Woman Lifting Potatoes	August 1885	Van Gogh Museum, Amsterdam	Nuenen	Oil on canvas on panel 41.8 x 32.5 cm	F 147; JH 891
Peasant Woman Digging	August 1885	Barber Institute of Fine Arts, Birmingham	Nuenen	Oil on canvas on panel 42 x 32 cm	F 95a JH 899
Peasant Woman Digging Up Potatoes	August 1885	Royal Museum of Fine Arts Antwerp	Nuenen	Oil on canvas on panel 31.5 x 38 cm	F 98; JH 901
Peasant Woman Digging Up Potatoes	August 1885	Private collection	Nuenen	38.5 x 26.5 cm	F 139; JH 905
Peasant Woman Laundering	August 1885	Private collection	Nuenen	29.5 x 36 cm	F 148; JH 908
Sheaves of Wheat in a Field	August 1885	Kröller-Müller Museum, Otterlo	Nuenen	40 x 30 cm	F 193; JH 914
Still Life with Earthenware, Bottle and Clogs	September 1885	Kröller-Müller Museum, Otterlo	Nuenen	Oil on canvas on panel 39 x 41.5 cm	F 63; JH 920
Still Life with Two Jars and Two Pumpkins	September 1885	Private collection	Nuenen	Oil on canvas on panel 58 x 85 cm	F 59; JH 921
Still Life with Straw Hat	September 1885	Kröller-Müller Museum, Otterlo	Nuenen	36.5 x 53.5 cm	F 62; JH 922
Still Life with Ginger Jar and Apples	September 1885	Private collection	Nuenen	Oil on canvas on panel 30.5 x 47 cm	F 104; JH 923
Still Life with Ginger Jar and Onions	September 1885	McMaster Museum of Art, Hamilton	Nuenen	39.3 x 49.6 cm	F 104a JH 924
Still Life with Brass Cauldron and Jug	September 1885	Van Gogh Museum, Amsterdam	Nuenen	65.5 x 80.5 cm	F 51; JH 925
Still Life with an Earthen Bowl and Pears	September 1885	Centraal Museum, Utrecht	Nuenen	33 x 43.5 cm	F 105; JH 926
Basket of Apples	September 1885	Van Gogh Museum, Amsterdam	Nuenen	33.5 x 44 cm	F 101; JH 927
Still Life with Vegetables and Fruit	September 1885	Van Gogh Museum, Amsterdam	Nuenen	32.3 x 43.2 cm	F 103; JH 928
Still Life with a Basket of Vegetables	September 1885	Private collection	Nuenen	35.5 x 45.5 cm	F 212a JH 929
Basket of Apples	September 1885	Van Gogh Museum, Amsterdam	Nuenen	40.5 x 60.4 cm	F 99; JH 930
Basket of Potatoes	September 1885	Van Gogh Museum, Amsterdam	Nuenen	45 x 60.5 cm	F 100; JH 931
Still Life with Potatoes	September 1885	Museum Boijmans Van Beuningen, Rotterdam	Nuenen	47 x 57 cm	F 118; JH932
Basket of Potatoes	September 1885	Van Gogh Museum, Amsterdam	Nuenen	65 x 78.5 cm	F 107; JH 933
Basket of Potatoes	September 1885	Van Gogh Museum, Amsterdam	Nuenen	50.8 x 66 cm	F 116; JH 934
Still Life with a Basket of Apples	September 1885	Private collection	Nuenen	30 x 47 cm	F 115; JH 935
Still Life with a Basket of Potatoes, Surrounded by Autumn Leaves and Vegetables	September 1885	Private collection	Nuenen	75 x 93 cm	F 102; JH 937
Still Life with a Basket of Apples, and Two Pumpkins	September–October 1885	Kröller-Müller Museum, Otterlo	Nuenen	59 x 84.5 cm	F 106; JH 936
Still Life with Three Birds' Nests	September–October 1885	Kröller-Müller Museum, Otterlo	Nuenen	33 x 42 cm	F 112; JH 938
Still Life with Birds' Nests	September–October 1885	Van Gogh Museum, Amsterdam	Nuenen	39.3 x 46.5 cm	F 111; JH 939
Still Life with Birds' Nests	September–October 1885	Van Gogh Museum, Amsterdam	Nuenen	31.4 x 43 cm	F 109r JH 942
The Vicarage at Nuenen	September–October 1885	Van Gogh Museum, Amsterdam	Nuenen	33 x 43 cm	F 182; JH 948
Still Life with Three Birds' Nests	October 1885	Kröller-Müller Museum, Otterlo	Nuenen	33.5 x 50 cm	F 108; JH 940
Still Life with Three Birds' Nests	October 1885	Gemeentemuseum Den Haag, The Hague	Nuenen	Oil on canvas on panel 43 x 57 cm	F 110; JH 941
View of Amsterdam from Central Station	October 1885	Private collection	Nuenen	Oil on panel 19 x 25.5 cm	F 113; JH 944
City View of Amsterdam (disputed)	October 1885	Van Gogh Museum, Amsterdam	Nuenen	Oil on canvas on panel 35 x 47 cm	F 114; JH 945
Still Life with Bible	October 1885	Van Gogh Museum, Amsterdam	Nuenen	65.7 x 78.5 cm	F 117; JH 946
View of a Town with Drawbridge	October 1885	Private collection	Nuenen	Oil on canvas on panel 42 x 49.5 cm	F 210; JH 947
Autumn Landscape	October 1885	Fitzwilliam Museum, Cambridge	Nuenen	Oil on canvas on panel 64.8 x 86.4 cm	F 119; JH 949
Country Lane with Two Figures	October 1885	Private collection	Nuenen	Oil on canvas on panel 32 x 39.5 cm	F 191a JH 950
The De Ruijterkade in Amsterdam	October 1885	Van Gogh Museum, Amsterdam	Amsterdam	Oil on panel 20.3 x 27 cm	F 211; JH 973
Autumn Landscape at Dusk	October–November 1885	Centraal Museum, Utrecht	Nuenen	Oil on canvas on panel 51 x 93 cm	F 121; JH 956
Flying Fox	October–November 1885	Van Gogh Museum, Amsterdam	Nuenen	41.5 x 79 cm	F 177a JH 1192
The Parsonage at Nuenen by Moonlight	November 1885	Private collection	Nuenen	41 x 54.5 cm	F 183; JH 952
The Parsonage Garden at Nuenen with Pond and Figures	November 1885	Destroyed by fire in Rotterdam during the Second World War	Nuenen	Oil on panel 92 x 104 cm	F 124; JH 955
Landscape with Windblown	November 1885	Private collection	Nuenen	32 x 50 cm	F 196; JH 957
Lane with Poplars	November 1885	Museum Boijmans Van Beuningen, Rotterdam	Nuenen	78 x 98 cm	F 45; JH 959
The Willow	November 1885	Private collection	Nuenen	42 x 30 cm	F 195; JH 961
Autumn Landscape with Four Trees	November 1885	Kröller-Müller Museum, Otterlo	Nuenen	64 x 89 cm	F 44; JH 962
Backyards of Old Houses in Antwerp in the Snow	December 1885	Van Gogh Museum, Amsterdam	Antwerp	44 x 33.5 cm	F 260; JH 970
Portrait of an Old Man with Beard	December 1885	Van Gogh Museum, Amsterdam	Antwerp	44.5 x 33.5 cm	F 205; JH 971
Head of a Woman with her Hair Loose	December 1885	Van Gogh Museum, Amsterdam	Antwerp	35 x 24 cm	F 206; JH 972
Head of an Old Woman with White Cap (The Midwife)	December 1885	Van Gogh Museum, Amsterdam	Antwerp	50 x 40 cm	F 174; JH 978
Portrait of a Woman with Red Ribbon	December 1885	Private collection	Antwerp	60 x 50 cm	F 207; JH 979
Skull of a Skeleton with Burning Cigarette	1885–86	Van Gogh Museum, Amsterdam	Antwerp	32 x 24.5 cm	F 212; JH 999
Portrait of a Woman in Blue	December 1885	Van Gogh Museum, Amsterdam	Antwerp	46 x 38.5 cm	F 207a JH 1204

== Paintings (Paris) ==
Image, Title	Date	Current location	Medium, Dimensions	No.
Nude Study of a Little Girl, Seated	1886 (Note: Due to a lack of letters sent to his brother Theo, the dating of Van Gogh's works during his Paris period is particularly difficult)	Van Gogh Museum, Amsterdam	27 x 22.5cm	F 215; JH 1045
Plaster Statuette of a Female Torso	1886	Van Gogh Museum, Amsterdam	47 x 38cm	F 216a JH 1054
Plaster Statuette of a Female Torso	1886	Van Gogh Museum, Amsterdam	40.5 x 27cm	F 216g JH 1055
Plaster Statuette of a Female Torso	1886	Van Gogh Museum, Amsterdam	41 x 32.5cm	F 216h JH 1058
Plaster Statuette of a Female Torso	1886	Van Gogh Museum, Amsterdam	35 x 27cm	F 216j JH 1059
Plaster Statuette of a Female Torso	1886	Van Gogh Museum, Amsterdam	46.5 x 38cm	F 216b JH 1060
Plaster Statuette of a Female Torso	1886	Van Gogh Museum, Amsterdam	Oil on cardboard on multiplex board 35 x 27cm	F 216d JH 1071
Plaster Statuette of a Female Torso	1886	Van Gogh Museum, Amsterdam	Oil on cardboard on multiplex board 32.5 x 24cm	F 216i JH 1072
Plaster Statuette of a Kneeling Man	1886	Van Gogh Museum, Amsterdam	Oil on cardboard on multiplex board 35 x 27cm	F 216f JH 1076
Plaster Statuette of a Male Torso	1886	Van Gogh Museum, Amsterdam	Oil on cardboard on multiplex board 35 x 27cm	F 216e JH 1078
Horse	1886	Van Gogh Museum, Amsterdam	Oil on cardboard on multiplex board 33 x 41cm	F 216c JH 1082
Self-Portrait with Dark Felt Hat	1886	Van Gogh Museum, Amsterdam	41.5 x 32.5cm	F 208a JH 1089
Self-Portrait with Dark Felt Hat at the Easel	1886	Van Gogh Museum, Amsterdam	46.5 x 38.5cm	F 181; JH 1090
Glass with Hellebores	1886	Private collection	31 x 22.5cm	F 199; JH 1091
Bowl with Daffodils	1886	Private collection	44 x 30cm	JH Add.1
Flowers in a Blue Vase	1886	Private collection	58 x 43.5cm	JH Add.20
Vase with Flowers	1886	Private collection	41.3 x 33cm	Verified as authentic by the Van Gogh Museum in 1991
Fritillaries	1886	Unknown	38 x 55cm	F 214; JH 1092
Tambourine with Pansies	1886	Van Gogh Museum, Amsterdam	46 x 55.5cm	F 244; JH 1093
Still Life with Scabiosa and Ranunculus	1886	Private collection	26 x 20cm	F 666; JH 1094
View of Roofs and Backs of Houses	1886	National Gallery of Canada, Ottawa	30 x 41cm	F 231; JH 1099
View of Paris from near Montmartre	1886	National Gallery of Ireland, Dublin	44.5 x 37cm	F 265; JH 1100
View of the Roofs of Paris`	1886	Van Gogh Museum, Amsterdam	54 x 72.5cm	F 261; JH 1101
View of Paris from Montmartre	1886	Kunstmuseum Basel	38.5 x 61.5	F 262; JH 1102
Still Life with Meadow Flowers and Roses	1886	Kröller-Müller Museum, Otterlo	99 x 79cm	F 278; JH 1103
Vase with Red Poppies	1886	Wadsworth Atheneum, Hartford	56 x 46.5cm	F 279; JH 1104 (Note: Authenticity confirmed by the Van Gogh Museum in January 2019)
Bowl with Peonies and Roses	1886	Kröller-Müller Museum, Otterlo	59 x 71cm	F 249; JH 1105
Vase with Myosotis and Peonies	1886	Van Gogh Museum, Amsterdam	34.5 x 27.5cm	F 243a JH 1106
Vase with Peonies	1886	Private collection	34 x 45cm	F 666a JH 1107
The Fourteenth of July Celebration in Paris	1886	Villa Flora, Winterthur	44 x 39cm	F 222; JH 1108
The Pont du Carrousel and the Louvre	1886	Ny Carlsberg Glyptotek, Copenhagen	31 x 44cm	F 221; JH 1109
The Bois de Boulogne with People Walking	1886	Private collection	37.5 x 45.5cm	F 225; JH 1110
Lane at the Jardin du Luxembourg	1886	Clark Art Institute, Williamstown	27.5 x 46cm	F 223; JH 1111
Bois de Boulogne with People Walking	Fall 1886	Private collection	46.5 x 38cm	F 224; JH 1112
Bois de Boulogne with People Walking	1886	Private collection	37.5 x 45.5cm	JH Add.2
Sloping Path in Montmartre	1886	Van Gogh Museum, Amsterdam	Oil on cardboard on multiplex board 22 x 16cm	F 232; JH 1113
Twilight, before the Storm: Montmartre	1886	Private collection	Oil on cardboard 15 x 10cm	F 1672; JH 1114
Le Moulin de la Galette	1886	Kelvingrove Art Gallery and Museum, Glasgow	46 x 38cm	F 274; JH 1115
Le Moulin de Blute-Fin	1886	Bridgestone Museum of Art, Tokyo	46.5 x 38cm	F 273; JH 1116
Le Blute-Fin Mill	1886	Museum de Fundatie, Zwolle	55.2 x 38	Discovered and authenticated by the Van Gogh Museum in Amsterdam in 2010.
Still Life with Mackerels, Lemon and Tomato	1886	Private collection	39 x 56.5cm	F 285; JH 1118
Still Life with Meat, Vegetables and Pottery	1886	Private collection	33.5 x 41cm	F 1670; JH 1119
Still Life with Bloaters	1886	Kunstmuseum Basel	21 x 42cm	F 283; JH 1120
Still Life with Bottle, Two Glasses, Cheese and Bread	1886	Van Gogh Museum, Amsterdam	37.5 x 46cm	F 253; JH 1121
Still Life with Two Herrings, a Cloth and a Glass	1886	Private collection	32.5 x 46cm	F 1671; JH 1122
Smoked Herring	1886	Kröller-Müller Museum, Otterlo	45 x 38cm	F 203; JH 1123
Shoes	1886	Van Gogh Museum, Amsterdam	37.5 x 45cm	F 255; JH 1124
Ginger Jar Filled with Chrysanthemums	1885	Private collection	40 x 29.5cm	F 198; JH 1125
Vase with Asters, Salvia and Other Flowers	1886	Gemeentemuseum Den Haag, The Hague	70.5 x 34cm	F 286; JH 1127
Vase with Gladioli and Lilac	1886	Private collection	69 x 33.5cm	F 286a JH 1128
Vase with Carnations	1886	Detroit Institute of Arts	43.2 x 35.6cm	F 243; JH 1129
Vase with White and Red Carnations	1886	Private collection	58 x 45.5cm	F 236; JH 1130
Vase with Gladioli and Carnations	1886	Museum Boijmans Van Beuningen, Rotterdam	65.5 x 35cm	F 237; JH 1131
Vase with Carnations and Zinnias	1886	Private collection	Oil on canvas on panel 61 x 50.2cm	F 259; JH 1132
Vase with Zinnias and Geraniums	1886	National Gallery of Canada, Ottawa	61 x 45.9cm	F 241; JH 1134
Vase with Carnations and Other Flowers	1886	Kreeger Museum, Washington D.C.	61 x 38cm	F 596; JH 1135
Vase with Hollyhocks	1886	Kunsthaus Zürich	91 x 50.5cm	F 235; JH 1136
Poppy Flowers	1886	Mohamed Mahmoud Khalil Museum, Cairo currently missing	65 x 54cm	F 324a JH 1137
Vase with Carnations	1886	Museum Boijmans Van Beuningen, Rotterdam	40 x 32.5cm	F 220; JH 1138
Geranium in a Flowerpot	1886	Private collection	46 x 38cm	F 201; JH 1139
Vase with Zinnias	1886	Kreeger Museum, Washington D.C.	61 x 48cm	F 252; JH 1140
White Vase with Roses and Other Flowers	1886	Private collection	37 x 25.5cm	F 258; JH 1141
Vase with Zinnias and Other Flowers	1886	Art Gallery of Ontario, Toronto	50.2 x 61cm	F 251; JH 1142
Coleus Plant in a Flowerpot	1886	Van Gogh Museum, Amsterdam	42 x 22cm	F 281; JH 1143
Glass with Roses	1886	Van Gogh Museum, Amsterdam	35 x 27cm	F 218; JH 1144
Vase with Carnations	1886	Stedelijk Museum, Amsterdam	46 x 37.5cm	F 245; JH 1145
Vase with Red Gladioli	1886	Private collection	50 x 39cm	F 248; JH 1146
Vase with Gladioli and Carnations	1886	Private collection	78.5 x 40.5cm	F 242; JH 1147
Vase with Gladioli	1886	Van Gogh Museum, Amsterdam	46.5 x 38.5cm	F 248a JH 1148
Vase with Red Gladioli	1886	Private collection	65 x 40cm	F 247; JH 1149
Vase with Red Gladioli	1886	Musée Jenisch, Vevey	65 x 35cm	F 248b JH 1150
Bowl with Chrysanthemums	1886	Private collection	46 x 61cm	F 217; JH 1164
Cineraria in a Flowerpot	1886	Museum Boijmans Van Beuningen, Rotterdam	54.5 x 46cm	F 282; JH 1165
Bowl with Sunflowers, Roses and Other Flowers	1886	Kunsthalle Mannheim	50 x 61cm	F 250; JH 1166
Vase with Daisies	1886	Philadelphia Museum of Art	40 x 56cm	F 197; JH 1167
Vase with Asters and Phlox	1886	Van Gogh Museum, Amsterdam	61 x 46cm	F 234; JH 1168
Still Life with Prawns and Mussels	1886	Van Gogh Museum, Amsterdam	26.5 x 34.5cm	F 256; JH 1169
Still Life with Fruit and Chestnuts	1886	Fine Arts Museums of San Francisco	27 x 35.6cm	Authenticated by the Van Gogh Museum in January 2019
Le Moulin de la Galette	1886	Kröller-Müller Museum, Otterlo	38.5 x 46cm	F 227; JH 1170
Le Moulin de la Galette	1886	Neue Nationalgalerie, Berlin	38 x 46.5cm	F 228; JH 1171
Le Moulin de la Galette	1886	Stiftung Langmatt, Baden	38 x 46cm	F 226; JH 1172
View of Montmartre with Windmills	1886	Kröller-Müller Museum, Otterlo	36 x 61cm	F 266; JH 1175
The Hill of Montmartre with Quarry	1886	Van Gogh Museum, Amsterdam	32 x 41cm	F 229; JH 1176
The Hill of Montmartre with Quarry	1886	Van Gogh Museum, Amsterdam	56 x 62.5cm	F 230; JH 1177
Terrace of a Cafe on Montmartre (La Guinguette)	1886	Musée d'Orsay, Paris	49 x 64cm	F 238; JH 1178
Outskirts of Paris	1886	Private collection Santa Barbara Museum of Art (Note: on loan)	Oil on canvas on cardboard 45.7 x 54.6cm	F 264; JH 1179
View of Montmartre with Quarry (disputed)	1886	Van Gogh Museum, Amsterdam	22.3 x 32.8cm	F 233; JH 1180
Le Moulin de la Galette	1886	Museo Nacional de Bellas Artes, Buenos Aires	61 x 50cm	F 348; JH 1182
Terrace and Observation Deck at the Moulin de Blute-Fin, Montmartre	1886	Art Institute of Chicago	43.6 x 33cm	F 272; JH 1183
Le Moulin de la Galette	1886	Private collection	55 x 38.5cm	F 349; JH 1184
Windmill on Montmartre	1886	Destroyed by fire in 1967	46.5 x 38cm	F 271; JH 1186
The Kingfisher	1886	Van Gogh Museum, Amsterdam	19 x 26.5cm	F 28; JH 1191
The Green Parrot (disputed)	1886	Private collection	48 x 43cm	F 14; JH 1193
Self-Portrait with Pipe	1886	Van Gogh Museum, Amsterdam	46 x 38cm	F 180; JH 1194
Self-Portrait with Pipe	1886	Van Gogh Museum, Amsterdam	27 x 19cm	F 208; JH 1195
Self-Portrait	1886	Gemeentemuseum Den Haag, The Hague	39.5 x 29.5cm	F 178v JH 1198
Self-Portrait with Pipe and Glass	1887	Van Gogh Museum, Amsterdam	61 x 50cm	F 263a JH 1199
Portrait of a Man with a Moustache	1887	Unknown	55 x 41cm	F 288; JH 1200
Portrait of Père Tanguy	1887	Ny Carlsberg Glyptotek, Copenhagen	47 x 38.5cm	F 263; JH 1202
Portrait of a Man with a Skull Cap	1887	Van Gogh Museum, Amsterdam	65.5 x 54.5cm	F 289; JH 1203
Portrait of a Woman, Facing Right	1887	Van Gogh Museum, Amsterdam	26.5 x 21cm	F 215b JH 1205
Portrait of a Woman with Hat	1887	Van Gogh Museum, Amsterdam	27 x 18.5cm	F 215c
Portrait of a Woman Seated	1887	Van Gogh Museum, Amsterdam	31.5 x 21.5cm	F 215d
Portrait of Léonie Rose Charbuy-Davy	1887	Van Gogh Museum, Amsterdam	61. x 45.5cm	F 369; JH 1206
Portrait of Alexander Reid, Sitting in an Easy Chair	1887	Fred Jones Jr. Museum of Art, Norman	41. x 33cm	F 270; JH 1207
Agostina Segatori Sitting in the Café du Tambourin	1887	Van Gogh Museum, Amsterdam	55.5 x 46.5cm	F 370; JH 1208
Self-portrait or Portrait of Theo van Gogh (Note: It is not clear whether this portrait depicts Vincent himself (as was formerly assumed) or his brother Theo.)	1887	Van Gogh Museum, Amsterdam	Oil on paperboard 19 x 14cm	F 294; JH 1209
Self-Portrait with Grey Felt Hat	1887	Van Gogh Museum, Amsterdam	Oil on cardboard 19 x 14cm	F 296; JH 1210
Self-Portrait with Grey Felt Hat	1887	Rijksmuseum, Amsterdam	Oil on cardboard 41 x 32cm	F 295; JH 1211
Nude Woman Reclining, Seen from the Back	1887	Private collection	38 x 61cm	F 328; JH 1212
Nude Woman on a Bed	1887	Barnes Foundation, Philadelphia	59.5 x 73cm	F 330; JH 1214
Nude Woman Reclining	1887	Kröller-Müller Museum, Otterlo	24 x 41cm	F 329; JH 1215
Portrait of a Woman (Madame Tanguy?)	1887	Kunstmuseum Basel	40 x 32cm	F 357; JH 1216
Boulevard de Clichy	1887	Van Gogh Museum, Amsterdam	42.5 x 55cm	F 292; JH 1219
Le Moulin de la Galette	1887	Carnegie Museum of Art, Pittsburgh	46 x 38cm	F 348a JH 1221
Factories Seen from a Hillside in Moonlight	1887	Van Gogh Museum, Amsterdam	21 x 46.5cm	F 266a JH 1223
Self-Portrait	1887	Van Gogh Museum, Amsterdam	Oil on cardboard 19 x 14cm	F 267; JH 1224
Self-Portrait	1887	Kröller-Müller Museum, Otterlo	Oil on paper 32 x 23cm	F 380; JH 1225
Still Life with Three Books	1887	Van Gogh Museum, Amsterdam	Oil on panel 31 x 48.5cm	F 335; JH 1226
Basket of Sprouting Bulbs	1887	Van Gogh Museum, Amsterdam	Oil on panel 31.5 x 48cm	F 336; JH 1227
Still Life with a Basket of Crocuses	1887	Van Gogh Museum, Amsterdam	32.5 x 41cm	F 334; JH 1228
Flowerpot with Chives	1887	Van Gogh Museum, Amsterdam	31.5 x 22cm	F 337; JH 1229
Still Life with Bloaters and Garlic	1887	Bridgestone Museum of Art, Tokyo	37 x 44.5cm	F 283b JH 1230
A Pair of Shoes	1887	Private collection	37.5 x 45.5cm	F 332a JH 1233
Three Pairs of Shoes	1887	Fogg Museum, Cambridge	49 x 72cm	F 332; JH 1234
A Pair of Shoes	1887	Van Gogh Museum, Amsterdam	Oil on paper on cardboard 33 x 41cm	F 331; JH 1235
A Pair of Shoes	1887	Baltimore Museum of Art	34 x 41.5cm	F 333; JH 1236
Still Life with Lemons on a Plate	1887	Van Gogh Museum, Amsterdam	21 x 26.5cm	F 338; JH 1237
Still Life with Absinthe	1887	Van Gogh Museum, Amsterdam	46.5 x 33cm	F 339; JH 1238
Still Life with Carafe and Lemons on a Plate	1887	Van Gogh Museum, Amsterdam	46.5 x 38.5cm	F 340; JH 1239
Street Scene in Montmartre	1887	Private collection	46 x 61cm	JH 1240
Street Scene in Montmartre: Le Moulin a Poivre	1887	Van Gogh Museum, Amsterdam	34.5 x 64.5cm	F 347; JH 1241
View of Paris from Vincent's Room in the Rue Lepic	1887	Van Gogh Museum, Amsterdam	46 x 38cm	F 341; JH 1242
View of Paris from Vincent's Room in the Rue Lepic	1887	Private collection	Oil on cardboard 56 x 38 cm	F 341a JH 1243
Vegetable Garden in Montmartre	1887	Van Gogh Museum, Amsterdam	44.8 x 81cm	F 346; JH 1244
Vegetable Garden in Montmartre: La Butte Montmartre	1887	Stedelijk Museum, Amsterdam	96 x 120cm	F 350; JH 1245
Vegetable Garden at Montmartre	1887	Van Gogh Museum, Amsterdam	81 x 100cm	F 316; JH 1246
Imperial Fritillaries in a Copper Vase	1887	Musée d'Orsay, Paris	73.5 x 60.5cm	F 213; JH 1247
Self-Portrait	1887	Van Gogh Museum, Amsterdam	41 x 33cm	F 356; JH 1248
Self-Portrait	1887	Art Institute of Chicago	42 x 33.7cm	F 345; JH 1249
Portrait of Art Dealer Alexander Reid	1887	Kelvingrove Art Gallery and Museum, Glasgow	Oil on cardboard 41.5 x 33.5cm	F 343; JH 1250
Restaurant de la Sirène at Asnières	1887	Musée d'Orsay, Paris	54.5 x 65.5cm	F 313; JH 1251
The Restaurant de la Sirène at Asnières	1887	Ashmolean Museum, Oxford	51.5 x 64cm	F 312; JH 1253
Walk Along the Banks of the Seine Near Asnières	1887	Van Gogh Museum, Amsterdam	49 x 65.5cm	F 299; JH 1254
On the Outskirts of Paris	1887	Private collection, Australia	38 x 46cm	F 351; JH 1255
Interior of a Restaurant	1887	Indianapolis Museum of Art	45.5 x 56.5cm	F 342; JH 1256
The Seine with a Rowing Boat	1887	Private collection	55 x 65cm	F 298; JH 1257
Couples in the Voyer d'Argenson Park at Asnières	1887	Van Gogh Museum, Amsterdam	75 x 112.5cm	F 314; JH 1258
Lane in Voyer d'Argenson Park at Asnières	1887	Yale University Art Gallery, New Haven	59 x 81cm	F 276; JH 1259
Outskirts of Paris: Road with Peasant Shouldering a Spade	1887	Private collection	48 x 73cm	F 361; JH 1260
Woman Sitting in the Grass	1887	Private collection	Oil on cardboard 41.5 x 34.5cm	F 367; JH 1261
A Woman Walking in a Garden	1887	Private collection Kunsthaus Zürich	48 x 60cm	F 368; JH 1262
Pasture in Bloom	1887	Kröller-Müller Museum, Otterlo	45.5 x 56.5cm	F 583; JH 1263
Park at Asnières in Spring	1887	Private collection	50 x 65cm	F 362; JH 1264
Entrance of Voyer d'Argenson Park at Asnières	1887	Private collection	55 x 67cm	F 305; JH 1265
The Rispal Restaurant at Asnières	1887	Nelson-Atkins Museum of Art, Kansas City	72 x 60cm	F 355; JH 1266
Roadway with Underpass	1887	Solomon R. Guggenheim Museum, New York	32.7 x 41cm	F 239; JH 1267
The Seine Bridge at Asnières	1887	Museum of Fine Arts, Houston	53 x 73cm	F 240; JH 1268
The Banks of the Seine	1887	Van Gogh Museum, Amsterdam	32 x 46cm	F 293; JH 1269
Fishing in Spring	1887	Art Institute of Chicago	50.5 x 60cm	F 354; JH 1270
The Banks of the Seine with Boats	1887	Private collection	48 x 55cm	F 353; JH 1271
Chestnut Tree in Blossom	1887	Van Gogh Museum, Amsterdam	56 x 46.5cm	F 270a JH 1272
Edge of a Wheatfield with Poppies	1887	Denver Art Museum	Oil on canvas on cardboard 40 x 32.5cm	F 310a JH1273
Wheat Field with a Partridge	1887	Van Gogh Museum, Amsterdam	34 x 65.5cm	F 310; JH1274
View of a River with Rowing Boats	1887	Norton Simon Museum, Pasadena	52 x 65cm	F 300; JH 1275
Lane in Voyer d'Argenson Park at Asnières	1887	Van Gogh Museum, Amsterdam	Oil on cardboard 33 x 42cm	F 275; JH 1278
Factories at Asnières Seen from the Quai de Clichy	1887	Saint Louis Art Museum, St. Louis	54 x 72cm	F 317; JH 1287
The Factories at Asnières	1887	Barnes Foundation, Philadelphia	46.5 x 54cm	F 318; JH 1288
Vase with Lilacs, Daisies and Anemones	1887	Musée d'Art et d'Histoire, Geneva	46.5 x 37.5cm	F 322; JH 1292
Vase with Cornflowers and Poppies	1887	Private collection	80 x 67cm	F 324; JH 1293
Lilacs	1887	Hammer Museum, Los Angeles	27.3 x 35.3cm	F 286b JH 1294
Vase with Daisies and Anemones	1887	Kröller-Müller Museum, Otterlo	61 x 38cm	F 323; JH 1295
Japonaiserie: Flowering Plum Tree, after Hiroshige's Plum Park in Kameido	1887	Van Gogh Museum, Amsterdam	55 x 46cm	F 371; JH 1296
Japonaiserie: Flowering Plum Tree, after Hiroshige's Sudden Shower over Shin-Ōhashi bridge and Atake	1887	Van Gogh Museum, Amsterdam	73 x 54cm	F 372; JH 1297
Japonaiserie: The Courtesan, after Keisai Eisen	1887	Van Gogh Museum, Amsterdam	105 x 60.5cm	F 373; JH 1298
Self-Portrait	1887	Wadsworth Atheneum, Hartford	41 x 33.5cm	F 268; JH 1299
Self-Portrait with Straw Hat and Pipe	1887	Van Gogh Museum, Amsterdam	41.5 x 31.5cm	F 179v JH 1300
Self-Portrait	1887	Van Gogh Museum, Amsterdam	42 x 34cm	F 269v JH 1301
Self-Portrait with Straw Hat	1887	Van Gogh Museum, Amsterdam	41 x 31cm	F 61v JH 1302
Self-Portrait	1887	Van Gogh Museum, Amsterdam	Oil on canvas on cardboard 42.5 x 31cm	F 109v JH 1303
Self-Portrait	1887	Van Gogh Museum, Amsterdam	41 x 33cm	F 77v JH 1304
Garden with sunflowers in front of the Debray Farmhouse	1887	Private collection	30.8 x 41cm	F 810; JH 2109
Montmartre Path with Sunflowers	1887	Fine Arts Museums of San Francisco	32 x 41cm	F 264a JH 1306
Garden with Sunflowers	1887	Van Gogh Museum, Amsterdam	42.5 x 35.5cm	F 388v JH 1307
Self-Portrait with Straw Hat	1887	Detroit Institute of Arts	Oil on canvas on panel 34.9 x 26.7cm	F 526; JH 1309
Self-Portrait with Straw Hat	1887	Van Gogh Museum, Amsterdam	Oil on cardboard 40.5 x 32.5cm	F 469; JH 1310
Exterior of a Restaurant at Asnières	1887	Courtauld Gallery, London	18.5 x 27cm	F 321; JH 1311
Trees and Undergrowth	1887	Van Gogh Museum, Amsterdam	46.5 x 55.5cm	F 309a JH 1312
Undergrowth	1887	Van Gogh Museum, Amsterdam	46 x 38cm	F 308; JH 1313
Trees in a Field on a Sunny Day	1887	Private collection	37 x 45.5cm	F 291; JH 1314
Path in the Woods	1887	Van Gogh Museum, Amsterdam	46 x 38.5cm	F 309; JH 1315
Avenue in Voyer d'Argenson Park at Asnières	1887	Israel Museum, Jerusalem	55 x 67cm	F 277; JH 1316
Undergrowth	1887	Centraal Museum, Utrecht	32 x 46cm	F 306; JH 1317
Trees and Undergrowth	1887	Van Gogh Museum, Amsterdam	46 x 36cm	F 307; JH 1318
Corner of Voyer d'Argenson Park at Asnières	1887	Private collection	49 x 65cm	F 315; JH 1320
Banks of the Seine with Pont de Clichy in the Spring	1887	Dallas Museum of Art	50 x 60cm	F 352; JH 1321
Banks of the Seine with Pont de Clichy	1887	Cleveland Museum of Art	30.5 x 39cm	F 302; JH 1322
The Seine with Pont de Clichy	1887	Private collection	55 x 46cm	F 303; JH 1323
The Laundry Boat on the Seine at Asnières	1887	Virginia Museum of Fine Arts, Richmond	19 x 27cm	F 311; JH 1325
The Seine with the Pont de la Grande Jatte	1887	Van Gogh Museum, Amsterdam	32 x 40.5cm	F 304; JH 1326
Bridges across the Seine at Asnières	1887	Foundation E.G. Bührle, Zürich	52 x 65cm	F 301; JH 1327
Two Cut Sunflowers	1887	Van Gogh Museum, Amsterdam	Oil on canvas on triplex board 21 x 27cm	F 377; JH 1328
Two Cut Sunflowers	1887	Metropolitan Museum of Art, New York	43.2 x 61cm	F 375; JH 1329
Four Cut Sunflowers	1887	Kröller-Müller Museum, Otterlo	60 x 100cm	F 452; JH 1330
Two Cut Sunflowers	1887	Museum of Fine Arts Bern	50 x 60cm	F 376; JH 1331
Still Life with French Novels and a Rose	1887	Private collection	73 x 93cm	F 359; JH 1332
Self-Portrait with a Japanese Print	1887	Kunstmuseum Basel	44 x 35cm	F 319; JH 1333
Self-Portrait	1887	Musée d'Orsay, Paris	47 x 35cm	F 320; JH 1334
Chrysanthemums and Wild Flowers in a Vase	1887	Metropolitan Museum of Art, New York	65 x 54cm	F 588; JH 1335
Still Life with Grapes	1887	Van Gogh Museum, Amsterdam	32.5 x 46cm	F 603; JH 1336
Still Life with Apples, Pears, Lemons and Grapes	1887	Art Institute of Chicago	46.5 x 55.2cm	F 382; JH 1337
Still Life with Red Cabbage and Garlic	1887	Van Gogh Museum, Amsterdam	50 x 64.5cm	F 374; JH 1338
Still Life with Red Grapes and Lemons	1887	Van Gogh Museum, Amsterdam	48.5 x 65cm	F 383; JH 1339
Still Life with Basket of Apples (to Lucien Pissarro)	1887	Kröller-Müller Museum, Otterlo	50 x 61cm	F 378; JH 1340
Still Life with Basket of Apples	1887	Saint Louis Art Museum	46.7 x 55.2cm	F 379; JH 1341
Still Life with Apples	1887	Van Gogh Museum, Amsterdam	46 x 61.5cm	F 254; JH 1342
Still Life with Quince Pears	1887	Galerie Neue Meister, Dresden	46 x 59.5cm	F 602; JH 1343
Self-Portrait	1887	Foundation E.G. Bührle, Zürich	46.5 x 35.5cm	F 366; JH 1345
Skull	1887	Van Gogh Museum, Amsterdam	Oil on canvas on triplex board 43 x 31cm	F 297; JH 1346
Skull	1887	Van Gogh Museum, Amsterdam	Oil on canvas on triplex board 41.5 x 31.5cm	F 297a JH 1347
Plaster Statuette of a Female Torso	1887	Menard Art Museum, Komaki	73 x 54.1 cm	F 216; JH 1348
Still Life with Plaster Statuette, a Rose and Two Novels	1887	Kröller-Müller Museum, Otterlo	50 x 61cm	F 360; JH 1349
Portrait of Père Tanguy	1887	Musée Rodin, Paris	92 x 75cm	F 363; JH 1351
Portrait of Père Tanguy	1887	Private collection	65 x 51cm	F 364; JH 1352
Self-Portrait with Grey Felt Hat	1887	Van Gogh Museum, Amsterdam	44 x 37.5cm	F 344; JH 1353
Self-Portrait with Grey Straw Hat	1887	Metropolitan Museum of Art, New York	40.6 x 31.8cm	F 365v JH 1354
Italian Woman (Agostina Segatori?)	1887	Musée d'Orsay, Paris	81 x 60cm	F 381; JH 1355
Self-Portrait as a Painter	1888	Van Gogh Museum, Amsterdam	65.5 x 50.5cm	F 522; JH 1356

== Paintings (Arles) ==
Image, Title	Date	Current location	Medium, Dimensions	Catalogue No.
An Old Woman of Arles	February 1888	Van Gogh Museum, Amsterdam	58 x 42.5cm	F 390; JH 1357
Snowy Landscape with Arles in the Background	February 1888	Private collection	50 x 60cm	F 391; JH 1358
A Pork-Butcher's Shop Seen from a Window	February 1888	Van Gogh Museum, Amsterdam	Oil on canvas on cardboard 39.5 x 32.5cm	F 389; JH 1359
Landscape with Snow	February 1888	Solomon R. Guggenheim Museum, New York	38 x 46cm	F 290; JH 1360
Almond Blossoms	March 1888	Van Gogh Museum, Amsterdam	24 x 19cm	F 392; JH 1361
Almond Blossoms	March 1888	Private collection	24 x 19cm	F 393; JH 1362
Still Life with Oranges Basket	March 1888	Private collection	45 x 54cm	F 395; JH 1363
A Pair of Leather Clogs	Autumn 1889	Van Gogh Museum, Amsterdam	32.5 x 40.5	F 607; JH 1364
Still Life: Potatoes in a Yellow Dish	March 1888	Kröller-Müller Museum, Otterlo	39 x 47cm	F 386; JH 1365
Avenue of Plane Trees near Arles Station	March 1888	Musée Rodin, Paris	46 x 49.5cm	F 398; JH 1366
The Gleize Bridge over the Vigueirat Canal	March 1888	Pola Museum of Art, Hakone	46 x 49cm	F 396; JH 1367
The Langlois Bridge at Arles with Women Washing	March 1888	Kröller-Müller Museum, Otterlo	54 x 65cm	F 397; JH 1368
Two Lovers	March 1888	Cleveland Museum of Art	32.5 x 23cm	F 544; JH 1369
The Langlois Bridge at Arles with Road Alongside the Canal	March 1888	Van Gogh Museum, Amsterdam	59.5 x 74cm	F 400; JH 1371
Pink Peach Tree in Blossom (Reminiscence of Mauve)	March 1888	Kröller-Müller Museum, Otterlo	73 x 59.5cm	F 394; JH 1379
Orchard with Blossoming Apricot Trees	March 1888	Van Gogh Museum, Amsterdam	64.5 x 80.5cm	F 555; JH 1380
Orchard in Blossom	March–April 1888	Metropolitan Museum of Art, New York	72.4 x 53.5cm	F 552; JH 1381
The White Orchard	April 1888	Van Gogh Museum, Amsterdam	60 x 81cm	F 403; JH 1378
Apricot Trees in Blossom	April 1888	Private collection	55 x 65.5cm	F 556; JH 1383
Orchard in Blossom	April 1888	Van Gogh Museum, Amsterdam	72.5 x 92cm	F 511; JH 1386
Orchard in Blossom (Plum Trees)	April 1888	Scottish National Gallery, Edinburgh	55 x 65cm	F 553; JH 1387
Orchard in Blossom, Bordered by Cypresses	April 1888	Yale University Art Gallery, New Haven	32.5 x 40cm	F 554; JH 1388
Orchard in Blossom, Bordered by Cypresses	April 1888	Kröller-Müller Museum, Otterlo	65 x 81cm	F 513; JH 1389
The Langlois Bridge at Arles	April 1888	Private collection	60 x 65cm	F 571; JH 1392
Blossoming Pear Tree	April 1888	Van Gogh Museum, Amsterdam	73 x 46cm	F 405; JH 1394
Orchard with Peach Trees in Blossom	April 1888	Private collection	65.2 x 80.2cm	F 551; JH 1396
Almond Tree in Blossom	April 1888	Van Gogh Museum, Amsterdam	48.5 x 36cm	F 557; JH 1397
Apricot Trees in Blossom	April 1888	Private collection	41 x 33cm	F 399; JH 1398
Orchard in Blossom	April 1888	Private collection	72 x 58cm	F 406; JH 1399
Path Through a Field with Willows	April 1888	Private collection	31.5 x 38.5cm	F 407; JH 1402
Peach Tree in Blossom	April–May 1888	Van Gogh Museum, Amsterdam	80.5 x 59.5cm	F 404; JH 1391
View of Arles with Irises in the Foreground	May 1888	Van Gogh Museum, Amsterdam	54 x 65cm	F 409; JH 1416
Farmhouse in a Wheat Field	May 1888	Van Gogh Museum, Amsterdam	45 x 50cm	F 408; JH 1417
A Lane near Arles	May 1888	Pomeranian State Museum, Greifswald	61 x 50cm	F 567; JH 1419
Langlois Bridge at Arles	May 1888	Wallraf–Richartz Museum, Cologne	49.5 x 64cm	F 570; JH 1421
Landscape under a Stormy Sky	May 1888	Private collection	59.5 x 70cm	F 575; JH 1422
Farmhouse in a Wheat Field near Arles	May 1888	Van Gogh Museum, Amsterdam	24.5 x 35cm	F 576; JH 1423
Still Life: Majolica Jug with Wildflowers	May 1888	Barnes Foundation, Philadelphia	55 x 46cm	F 600; JH 1424
Still Life: Bottle, Lemons and Oranges	May 1888	Kröller-Müller Museum, Otterlo	53 x 63cm	F 384; JH 1425
Still Life: Blue Enamel Coffeepot, Earthenware and Fruit (in Polish)	May 1888	Goulandris Museum of Contemporary Art, Athens	65 x 81cm	F 410; JH 1426
Still Life: Bowl with Daisies	May 1888	Virginia Museum of Fine Arts, Richmond	33 x 42cm	F 591; JH 1429
Harvest at La Crau, with Montmajour in the Background	June 1888	Van Gogh Museum, Amsterdam	73 x 92cm	F 412; JH 1440
Haystacks in Provence	June 1888	Kröller-Müller Museum, Otterlo	73 x 92.5cm	F 425; JH 1442
Farmhouse in Provence	June 1888	National Gallery of Art, Washington D.C.	46.1 x 60.9cm	F 565; JH 1443
View of Saintes-Maries	June 1888	Kröller-Müller Museum, Otterlo	64 x 53cm	F 416; JH 1447
Seascape at Saintes-Maries	June 1888	Van Gogh Museum, Amsterdam	51 x 64cm	F 415; JH 1452
Seascape at Saintes-Maries	June 1888	Pushkin Museum, Moscow	44 x 53cm	F 417; JH 1453
Fishing Boats on the Beach at Saintes-Maries	June 1888	Van Gogh Museum, Amsterdam	65 x 81.5cm	F 413; JH 1460
Street in Saintes-Maries	June 1888	Private collection	38.3 x 46.1cm	F 420; JH 1462
Three White Cottages in Saintes-Maries	June 1888	Kunsthaus Zürich	33.5 x 41.5cm	F 419; JH 1465
Girl with Ruffled Hair ("The Mudlark")	June 1888	Private collection	35.5 x 24.5cm	F 535; JH 1467
The Bridge at Trinquetaille	June 1888	Private collection	65 x 81cm	F 426; JH 1468
The Sower	June 1888	Kröller-Müller Museum, Otterlo	64 x 80.5cm	F 422; JH 1470
Summer Evening in Arles	June 1888	Kunstmuseum Winterthur	73.5 x 92cm	F 465; JH 1473
Wheat Field	June 1888	Private collection	50 x 61cm	F 564; JH 1475
Wheat Field with the Alpilles Foothills in the Background	June 1888	Van Gogh Museum, Amsterdam	Oil on canvas on cardboard 54 x 65cm	F 411; JH 1476
Arles: View from the Wheat Fields	June 1888	Musée Rodin, Paris	73 x 54cm	F 545; JH 1477
Wheat Field with Stacks	June 1888	Private collection	28.5 x 37cm	JH 1478
Wheat Field with Sheaves	June 1888	Honolulu Museum of Art	55.2 x 66.6cm	F 561; JH 1480
Harvest in Provence	June 1888	Israel Museum, Jerusalem	50 x 60cm	F 558; JH 1481
Green Ears of Wheat	June 1888	Israel Museum, Jerusalem	54 x 65cm	F 562; JH 1483
The Zouave (Half Length)	June 1888	Van Gogh Museum, Amsterdam	65 x 54cm	F 423; JH 1486
The Seated Zouave	June 1888	Private collection	81 x 65cm	F 424; JH 1488
Sunset at Montmajour	4 July 1888	Private collection	93.3 x 73.3cm	(Note: Authenticated by the Van Gogh Museum in September 2013)
Rocks with Oak Tree	July 1888	Kröller-Müller Museum, Otterlo	54 x 65cm	F 466; JH 1489
Canal with Women Washing	July 1888	Private collection	74 x 60cm	F 427; JH 1490
The Painter on the Road to Tarascon	July 1888	Destroyed by fire in World War II	48 x 44cm	F 448; JH 1491
Sunny Lawn in a Public Park	July 1888	Kunsthaus Zürich	60.5 x 73.5cm	F 428; JH 1499
Flowering Garden	July 1888	Private collection	92 x 73cm	F 430; JH 1510
Flowering Garden with Path	July 1888	Kunstmuseum Den Haag, The Hague	72 x 91cm	F 429; JH 1513
La Mousmé Sitting	July 1888	National Gallery of Art, Washington D.C.	74 x 60cm	F 431; JH 1519
Portrait of the Postman Joseph Roulin	August 1888	Museum of Fine Arts, Boston	81.2 x 65.3cm	F 432; JH 1522
Portrait of the Postman Joseph Roulin	August 1888	Detroit Institute of Arts	64.1 x 47.9cm	F 433; JH 1524
Garden Behind a House	August 1888	Private collection	63.5 x 52.5cm	F 578; JH 1538
Portrait of Patience Escalier, Shepherd in Provence	August 1888	Norton Simon Museum, Pasadena	64 x 54cm	F 443; JH 1548
Thistles	August 1888	Private collection	59 x 49cm	F 447; JH 1550
Two Thistles	August 1888	Private collection	55 x 45cm	F 447a JH 1551
Railway Carriages	August 1888	Angladon Museum, Avignon	45 x 50cm	F 446; JH 1553
Encampment of Gypsies with Caravans	August 1888	Musée d'Orsay, Paris	45 x 51cm	F 445; JH 1554
Quay with Men Unloading Sand Barges	August 1888	Museum Folkwang, Essen	55.1 x 66.2cm	F 449; JH 1558
Three Sunflowers in a Vase	August 1888	Private collection	73 x 58cm	F 453; JH 1559
Still Life: Vase with Five Sunflowers	August 1888	Destroyed by fire in World War II	98 x 69cm	F 459; JH 1560
Still Life: Vase with Twelve Sunflowers	August 1888	Neue Pinakothek, Munich	91 x 72cm	F 456; JH 1561
Still Life: Vase with Fifteen Sunflowers	August 1888	National Gallery, London	93 x 73cm	F 454; JH 1562
Portrait of Patience Escalier	August 1888	Kunsthaus Zürich	69 x 56cm	F 444; JH 1563
Self-Portrait with Pipe and Straw Hat	August 1888	Van Gogh Museum, Amsterdam	Oil on canvas on cardboard 42 x 30cm	F 524; JH 1565
Still Life: Vase with Oleanders and Books	August 1888	Metropolitan Museum of Art, New York	60.3 x 73.6cm	F 593; JH 1566
Still Life: Vase with Oleanders	August 1888	Unknown	56 x 36cm	F 594; JH 1567
Still Life: Vase with Zinnias	August 1888	Private collection	64 x 49.5cm	F 592; JH 1568
A Pair of Shoes	August 1888	Metropolitan Museum of Art, New York	44 x 53cm	F 461; JH 1569
Coal Barges	August 1888	Private collection	71 x 95cm	F 437; JH 1570
Coal Barges	August 1888	Thyssen-Bornemisza Museum, Madrid	54 x 65cm	F 438; JH 1571
Interior of the Restaurant Venissac in Arles	August 1888	Private collection	54 x 64.5cm	F 549; JH 1572
Interior of the Restaurant in Arles	August 1888	Private collection	65.5 x 81cm	F 549a JH 1573
Portrait of Eugene Boch	September 1888	Musée d'Orsay, Paris	60 x 45cm	F 462; JH 1574
The Night Café	September 1888	Yale University Art Gallery, New Haven	70 x 89cm	F 463; JH 1575
The Old Mill	September 1888	Albright–Knox Art Gallery, Buffalo	64.5 x 54cm	F 550; JH 1577
The Poet's Garden	September 1888	Art Institute of Chicago	73 x 91.2cm	F 468; JH 1578
Café Terrace at Night	September 1888	Kröller-Müller Museum, Otterlo	81 x 65.5cm	F 467; JH 1580
Self-Portrait (Dedicated to Paul Gauguin)	September 1888	Fogg Museum, Cambridge	62 x 52cm	F 476; JH 1581
A Lane in the Public Garden at Arles	September 1888	Kröller-Müller Museum, Otterlo	73 x 92cm	F 470; JH 1582
Entrance to the Public Park in Arles	September 1888	The Phillips Collection, Washington D.C.	72.5 x 91cm	F 566; JH 1585
Ploughed Field	September 1888	Van Gogh Museum, Amsterdam	72.5 x 92.5cm	F 574; JH 1586
Portrait of Miliet, Second Lieutenant of the Zouaves	September 1888	Kröller-Müller Museum, Otterlo	60 x 49cm	F 473; JH 1588
The Yellow House	September 1888	Van Gogh Museum, Amsterdam	72 x 91.5cm	F 464; JH 1589
Starry Night Over the Rhône	September 1888	Musée d'Orsay, Paris	72.5 x 92	F 474; JH 1592
The Green Vineyard	September 1888	Kröller-Müller Museum, Otterlo	72 x 92cm	F 475; JH 1595
The Sower: Outskirts of Arles in the Background	September 1888	Hammer Museum, Los Angeles	33.6 x 40.4cm	F 575a JH 1596
Willows at Sunset	Autumn 1888	Kröller-Müller Museum, Otterlo	31.5 x 34.5cm	F 572; JH 1597
The Public Park at Arles	October 1888	Private collection	72 x 93cm	F 472; JH 1598
The Brothel	October 1888	Barnes Foundation, Philadelphia	33 x 41cm	F 478; JH 1599
Portrait of the Artist's Mother	October 1888	Norton Simon Museum, Pasadena	40.5 x 32.5cm	F 477; JH 1600
Public Garden with Couple and Blue Fir Tree: The Poet's Garden III	October 1888	Private collection	73 x 92cm	F 479; JH 1601
The Railway Bridge over Avenue Montmajour, Arles	October 1888	Private collection	71 x 92cm	F 480; JH 1603
The Trinquetaille Bridge	October 1888	Private collection	73.5 x 92.5cm	F 481; JH 1604
Tarascon Diligence	October 1888	Princeton University Art Museum	72 x 92cm	F 478a JH 1605
Bedroom in Arles	October 1888	Van Gogh Museum, Amsterdam	72 x 90cm	F 482; JH 1608
Still Life: French Novels	October 1888	Van Gogh Museum, Amsterdam	53 x 73.2cm	F 358; JH 1612
The Park at Arles with the Entrance Seen through the Trees	October 1888	Destroyed by fire in World War II	74 x 62cm	F 471; JH 1613
The Lovers: The Poet's Garden IV	October 1888	Unknown	75 x 92cm	F 485; JH 1615
The Sower	October 1888	Villa Flora, Winterthur	72 x 91.5cm	F 494; JH 1617
Trunk of an Old Yew Tree	October 1888	Private collection	91 x 71cm	F 573; JH 1618
Les Alyscamps: Falling Autumn Leaves	November 1888	Kröller-Müller Museum, Otterlo	73 x 92cm	F 486; JH 1620
Les Alyscamps	November 1888	Private collection	72 x 91cm	F 487; JH 1621
Les Alyscamps	November 1888	Goulandris Museum of Contemporary Art, Athens	93 x 72cm	F 568; JH 1622
Les Alyscamps`	November 1888	Private collection	92 x 73.5cm	F 569; JH 1623
L'Arlésienne: Madame Ginoux with Books	November 1888	Metropolitan Museum of Art, New York	91.4 x 73.7cm	F 488; JH 1624
L'Arlésienne: Madame Ginoux with Gloves and Umbrella	November 1888	Musée d'Orsay, Paris	93 x 74cm	F 489; JH 1625
The Red Vineyard	November 1888	Pushkin Museum, Moscow	75 x 93cm	F 495; JH 1626
The Sower	November 1888	Foundation E.G. Bührle, Zürich	Oil on burlap on canvas 73.5 x 93	F 450; JH 1627
The Sower	November 1888	Van Gogh Museum, Amsterdam	32 x 40cm	F 451; JH 1628
Memory of the Garden at Etten	November 1888	Hermitage Museum, Saint Petersburg	73.5 x 92.5cm	F 496; JH 1630
The Novel Reader	November 1888	São Paulo Museum of Art	73 x 92.1cm	F 497; JH 1632
Self Portrait	November–December 1888	Private collection	46 x 38cm	F 501; JH 1634
Mother Roulin with Her Baby	November–December 1888	Philadelphia Museum of Art	92 x 73.5cm	F 490; JH 1637
Mother Roulin with Her Baby	November–December 1888	Metropolitan Museum of Art, New York	63.5 x 51cm	F 491; JH 1638
Portrait of Armand Roulin	November–December 1888	Museum Folkwang, Essen	65 x 54.1cm	F 492; JH 1642
Portrait of Armand Roulin	November–December 1888	Museum Boijmans Van Beuningen, Rotterdam	65 x 54cm	F 493; JH 1643
Portrait of Camille Roulin	November–December 1888	Philadelphia Museum of Art	43 x 35cm	F 537; JH 1644
Portrait of Camille Roulin	November–December 1888	Van Gogh Museum, Amsterdam	40.5 x 32.5cm	F 538; JH 1645
Portrait of Madame Augustine Roulin	November–December 1888	Am Römerholz	55 x 65cm	F 503; JH 1646
Portrait of the Postman Joseph Roulin	November–December 1888	Kunstmuseum Winterthur	65 x 54cm	F 434; JH 1647
Portrait of Gauguin	December 1888	Van Gogh Museum, Amsterdam	Oil on jute 37 x 33cm	F 546
Van Gogh's Chair	December 1888	National Gallery, London	93 x 73.5cm	F 498; JH 1635
Paul Gauguin's Armchair	December 1888	Van Gogh Museum, Amsterdam	90.5 x 72.5cm	F 499; JH 1636
Baby Marcelle Roulin	December 1888	National Gallery of Art, Washington D.C.	35 x 24cm	F 440; JH 1639
Baby Marcelle Roulin	December 1888	Private collection	34.3 x 23.5cm	F 441a JH 1640
Baby Marcelle Roulin	December 1888	Van Gogh Museum, Amsterdam	35 x 24.5cm	F 441; JH 1641
Young Man with a Cap	December 1888	Private collection	47.5 x 39cm	F 536; JH 1648
Portrait of a Man	December 1888	Kröller-Müller Museum, Otterlo	65 x 54.5cm	F 533; JH 1649
Portrait of a One-Eyed Man	December 1888	Van Gogh Museum, Amsterdam	56 x 36.5cm	F 532; JH 1650
The Smoker	December 1888	Barnes Foundation, Philadelphia	62 x 47cm	F 534; JH 1651
The Dance Hall in Arles	December 1888	Musée d'Orsay, Paris	65 x 81cm	F 547; JH 1652
Spectators in the Arena at Arles	December 1888	Hermitage Museum, Saint Petersburg	73 x 92cm	F 548; JH 1653
La Berceuse (Augustine Roulin)	December 1888	Kröller-Müller Museum, Otterlo	92 x 73cm	F 504; JH 1655
The Schoolboy (Camille Roulin)	December 1888	São Paulo Museum of Art	63.5 x 54cm	F 665; JH 1879
Still Life: Drawing Board, Pipe, Onions and Sealing-Wax	January 1889	Kröller-Müller Museum, Otterlo	50 x 64cm	F 604; JH 1656
Self-Portrait with Bandaged Ear	January 1889	Courtauld Gallery, London	60 x 49cm	F 527; JH 1657
Self-Portrait with Bandaged Ear and Pipe	January 1889	Private collection	51 x 45cm	F 529; JH 1658
Portrait of Doctor Félix Rey	January 1889	Pushkin Museum, Moscow	64 x 53cm	F 500; JH 1659
Still Life: Two Red Herrings	January 1889	Private collection	33 x 47cm	F 283a JH 1660
Still Life: Bloaters on a Piece of Yellow Paper	January 1889	Private collection	33 x 41cm	F 510; JH 1661
Two Crabs	January 1889	National Gallery, London	47 x 61cm	F 606; JH 1662
Crab on its Back	January 1889	Van Gogh Museum, Amsterdam	38 x 46.5cm	F 605; JH 1663
Still Life with Oranges, Lemons and Blue Gloves	January 1889	National Gallery of Art, Washington D.C.	47.3 x 64.3cm	F 502; JH 1664
Still Life: Vase with Fifteen Sunflowers †	January 1889	Sompo Japan Museum of Art	100.5 x 76.5cm	F 457; JH 1666
Still Life: Vase with Fifteen Sunflowers	January 1889	Van Gogh Museum, Amsterdam	95 x 73cm	F 458; JH 1667
Still Life: Vase with Twelve Sunflowers	January 1889	Philadelphia Museum of Art	92 x 72.5cm	F 455; JH 1668
La Berceuse (Augustine Roulin)	January 1889	Metropolitan Museum of Art, New York	93 x 74cm	F 505; JH 1669
La Berceuse (Augustine Roulin)	January 1889	Art Institute of Chicago	92.7 x 73.8cm	F 506; JH 1670
La Berceuse (Augustine Roulin)	February 1889	Museum of Fine Arts, Boston	92.7 x 73.8cm	F 508; JH 1671
La Berceuse (Augustine Roulin)	March 1889	Stedelijk Museum, Amsterdam	91 x 71.5cm	F 507; JH 1672
Portrait of the Postman Joseph Roulin	April 1889	Kröller-Müller Museum, Otterlo	65 x 54cm	F 439; JH 1673
Portrait of the Postman Joseph Roulin	April 1889	Barnes Foundation, Philadelphia	67.5 x 56cm	F 435; JH 1674
Portrait of the Postman Joseph Roulin †	April 1889	Museum of Modern Art, New York	64 x 54.5cm	F 436; JH 1675
Grass and Butterflies	April 1889	Private collection	51 x 51cm	F 460; JH 1676
Two White Butterflies	April 1889	Van Gogh Museum, Amsterdam	55 x 45.5cm	F 402; JH 1677
Clumps of Grass	April 1889	Pola Museum of Art, Hakone	44.5 x 49cm	F 582; JH 1678
Rosebush in Blossom	April 1889	National Museum of Western Art, Tokyo	33 x 42cm	F 580; JH 1679
A Field of Yellow Flowers	April 1889	Kunstmuseum Winterthur	35 x 57cm	F 584; JH 1680
La Crau with Peach Trees in Blossom	April 1889	Van Gogh Museum, Amsterdam	65.5 x 81.5cm	F 514; JH 1681
View of Arles with Trees in Blossom	April 1889	Van Gogh Museum, Amsterdam	50.5 x 65cm	F 515; JH 1683
View of Arles, Flowering Orchards	April 1889	Neue Pinakothek, Munich	72 x 92cm	F 516; JH 1685
Ward in the Hospital in Arles	April 1889	Am Römerholz	74 x 92cm	F 646; JH 1686
Garden of the Hospital in Arles	April 1889	Am Römerholz	73 x 92cm	F 519; JH 1687
Red Chestnuts in the Public Park at Arles	April 1889	Private collection	72.5 x 92cm	F 517; JH 1689
Pollard Willows	April 1889	Private collection	55 x 65cm	F 520; JH 1690

== Paintings (Saint-Rémy) ==
Image, Title	Date	Current location	Medium, Dimensions	Catalogue No.
Irises †	May 1889	J. Paul Getty Museum, Los Angeles	71 x 93cm	F 608; JH 1691
Lilacs	May 1889	Hermitage Museum, Saint Petersburg	73 x 92cm	F 579; JH 1692
A Corner in the Garden of Saint-Paul Hospital	May 1889	Unknown	92 x 72cm	F 609; JH 1693
The Garden of Saint-Paul Hospital	May 1889	Kröller-Müller Museum, Otterlo	95 x 75.5cm	F 734; JH 1698
The Iris	May 1889	National Gallery of Canada, Ottawa	Oil on paper on canvas 62.2 x 48.3cm	F 601; JH 1699
Great Peacock Moth	May 1889	Van Gogh Museum, Amsterdam	33.5 x 24.5cm	F 610; JH 1702
Field of Spring Wheat at Sunrise	May–June 1889	Kröller-Müller Museum, Otterlo	72 x 95cm	F 720; JH 1728
At the Foot of the Mountains	June 1889	Van Gogh Museum, Amsterdam	72 x 95cm	F 723; JH 1722
Mountainous Landscape Behind Saint-Paul Hospital	June 1889	Ny Carlsberg Glyptotek, Copenhagen	70.5 x 88.5cm	F 611; JH 1723
Green Wheat Field with Cypress	June 1889	National Gallery in Prague	73.5 x 92.5cm	F 719; JH 1725
Green Wheat Field	June 1889	Kunsthaus Zürich	73 x 92cm	F 718; JH 1727
The Starry Night	June 1889	Museum of Modern Art, New York	73 x 92cm	F 612; JH 1731
Olive Trees with the Alpilles in the Background	June 1889	Museum of Modern Art, New York	72.5 x 92cm	F 712; JH 1740
Le Mont Gaussier with the Mas de Saint-Paul	June 1889	Private collection	53 x 70cm	F 725; JH 1744
Cypresses	June 1889	Metropolitan Museum of Art, New York	93.3 x 74cm	F 613; JH 1746
Cypresses with Two Female Figures	June 1889	Kröller-Müller Museum, Otterlo	92 x 73cm	F 620; JH 1748
Field with Poppies	June 1889	Kunsthalle Bremen	71 x 91cm	F 581; JH 1751
Wheat Field with Reaper and Sun	June 1889	Kröller-Müller Museum, Otterlo	72 x 92cm	F 617; JH 1753
Wheat Field with Cypresses	June 1889	Metropolitan Museum of Art, New York	73 x 93.5cm	F 717; JH 1756
Olive Grove	June 1889	Kröller-Müller Museum, Otterlo	72 x 92cm	F 585; JH 1758
Olive Orchard	June 1889	Nelson-Atkins Museum of Art, Missouri	73 x 93cm	F 715; JH 1759
Olive Grove: Bright Blue Sky	June 1889	Van Gogh Museum, Amsterdam	45.5 x 59.5cm	F 709; JH 1760
Evening Landscape with Rising Moon	July 1889	Kröller-Müller Museum, Otterlo	72 x 92.5cm	F 735; JH 1761
Tree Trunks with Ivy	July 1889	Van Gogh Museum, Amsterdam	73 x 92.5cm	F 746; JH 1762
Tree Trunks with Ivy	July 1889	Kröller-Müller Museum, Otterlo	45 x 60cm	F 747; JH 1763
Underground with Ivy	July 1889	Van Gogh Museum, Amsterdam	49 x 65cm	F 745; JH 1764
Mountains at Saint-Rémy with Dark Cottage	July 1889	Solomon R. Guggenheim Museum, New York	71.8 x 90.8cm	F 622; JH 1766
Entrance to a Quarry	July 1889	Van Gogh Museum, Amsterdam	60 x 73.5cm	F 744; JH 1802
Self-Portrait	August 1889	National Gallery of Art, Washington D.C.	57 x 43.5cm	F 626; JH 1770
Enclosed Field with Ploughman	September 1889	National Gallery, London	50.3 x 64.9cm	F 625; JH 1768
Self-portrait without beard	September 1889	Private collection	40 x 31cm	F 525; JH 1665
Wheat Field with Cypresses	September 1889	National Gallery, London	72.1 x 90.9cm	F 615; JH 1755
Bedroom in Arles	September 1889	Art Institute of Chicago	73.6 x 92.3cm	F 484; JH 1771
Self-portrait	September 1889	Musée d'Orsay, Paris	65 x 54cm	F 627; JH 1772
Wheat Fields with Reaper at Sunrise	September 1889	Van Gogh Museum, Amsterdam	73 x 92cm	F 618; JH 1773
Portrait of Trabuc, an Attendant at Saint-Paul Hospital	September 1889	Kunstmuseum Solothurn	61 x 46cm	F 629; JH 1774
Pietà, after Delacroix	September 1889	Van Gogh Museum, Amsterdam	73 x 60.5cm	F 630; JH 1775
Pietà, after Delacroix	September 1889	Collection of Modern Religious Art, Vatican City	42 x 34cm	F 757; JH 1776
Portrait of Madame Trabuc	September 1889	Hermitage Museum, Saint Petersburg	Oil on canvas on panel 64 x 49cm	F 631; JH 1777
Half Figure of an Angel, after Rembrandt	September 1889	Private collection	54 x 64cm	F 624; JH 1778
Portrait of a Young Peasant	September 1889	Galleria Nazionale d'Arte Moderna, Rome	61 x 50cm	F 531; JH 1779
Peasant Woman Binding Sheaves, after Millet	September 1889	Van Gogh Museum, Amsterdam	43 x 33cm	F 700; JH 1781
Reaper with Sickle, after Millet	September 1889	Van Gogh Museum, Amsterdam	44 x 33cm	F 687; JH 1782
The Reaper, after Millet	September 1889	Private collection	43.3 x 24.3cm	F 688; JH 1783
The Thresher, after Millet	September 1889	Van Gogh Museum, Amsterdam	44 x 27.5cm	F 692; JH 1784
The Sheaf-Binder, after Millet	September 1889	Van Gogh Museum, Amsterdam	44.5 x 32cm	F 693; JH 1785
The Spinner, after Millet	September 1889	Private collection	40 x 25.5cm	F 696; JH 1786
The Sheaf-Shearers, after Millet	September 1889	Van Gogh Museum, Amsterdam	43.5 x 29.5cm	F 634; JH 1787
Peasant Woman Cutting Straw, after Millet	September 1889	Van Gogh Museum, Amsterdam	40.5 x 26.5cm	F 697; JH 1788
Peasant Woman with a Rake, after Millet	September 1889	Private collection	39 x 24cm	F 698; JH 1789
Wheat Field with Cypresses	September 1889	Private collection	51.5 x 65cm	F 743; JH 1790
Olive Trees	September 1889	Private collection	53.5 x 64.5cm	F 711; JH 1791
Wheat Field Behind Saint-Paul Hospital with a Reaper	September 1889	Museum Folkwang, Essen	59.5 x 72.5cm	F 619; JH 1792
Bedroom in Arles	September 1889	Musée d'Orsay, Paris	56.5 x 74cm	F 483; JH 1793
Entrance to a Quarry near Saint-Rémy	October 1889	Private collection	52 x 64cm	F 635; JH 1767
Field with Ploughman and Mill	October 1889	Museum of Fine Arts, Boston	54 x 65.4cm	F 706; JH 1794
Enclosed Field with Peasant	October 1889	Indianapolis Museum of Art	73.5 x 92cm	F 641; JH 1795
The Mulberry Tree	October 1889	Norton Simon Museum, Pasadena	54 x 65cm	F 637; JH 1796
Two Poplars on a Road Through the Hills	October 1889	Cleveland Museum of Art	61.6 x 45.7cm	F 638; JH 1797
Trees in the Garden of Saint-Paul Hospital	October 1889	Private collection	73 x 60cm	F 642; JH 1798
Trees in the Garden of Saint-Paul Hospital	October 1889	Hammer Museum, Los Angeles	90.2 x 73.3cm	F 643; JH 1799
The Garden of Saint-Paul Hospital	October 1889	Private collection	66.7 x 51.5 cm	F 640; JH 1800
Trees in the Garden of Saint-Paul Hospital	October 1889	Private collection	41.6 x 33.5cm	F 731; JH 1801
The Ravine of the Peyroulets	October 1889	Van Gogh Museum, Amsterdam	32 x 41cm	F 645; JH 1803
The Ravine of the Peyroulets	October 1889	Museum of Fine Arts, Boston	73 x 92cm	F 662; JH 1804
The Man is at Sea, after Demont-Breton	October 1889	Private collection	66 x 51cm	F 644; JH 1805
Portrait of a Patient in Saint-Paul Hospital	October 1889	Van Gogh Museum, Amsterdam	32.5 x 23.5cm	F 703; JH 1832
Two Peasants Digging, after Millet	October 1889	Stedelijk Museum, Amsterdam	72 x 92cm	F 648; JH 1833
Evening: The Watch, after Millet	October 1889	Van Gogh Museum, Amsterdam	74.5 x 93.5cm	F 647; JH 1834
The Sower, after Millet	October 1889	Private collection	80.8 x 66cm	F 690; JH 1837
The Garden of Saint-Paul Hospital	October 1889	Private collection	50 x 63cm	F 730; JH 1841
The Walk: Falling Leaves	October 1889	Van Gogh Museum, Amsterdam	73.5 x 60.5cm	F 651; JH 1844
View of the Asylum and Chapel of Saint-Rémy	October 1889	Private collection	45.2 x 60.3cm	F 803; JH 2124
Wooden Sheds Among Olive Trees and Cypresses	October 1889	Private collection	45.5 x 60.3cm	F 623; JH 1873
The Sower, after Millet	October–November 1889	Kröller-Müller Museum, Otterlo	64 x 55cm	F 689; JH 1836
Evening: The End of the Day, after Millet	November 1889	Menard Art Museum, Komaki	72 x 94cm	F 649; JH 1835
The Shepherdess, after Millet	November 1889	Tel Aviv Museum of Art	52.7 x 40.7cm	F 699; JH 1838
Wheat Field in Rain	November 1889	Philadelphia Museum of Art	74.3 x 93.1cm	F 650; JH 1839
Pine Trees with Figure in the Garden of Saint-Paul Hospital	November 1889	Musée d'Orsay, Paris	58 x 45cm	F 653; JH 1840
Stone Bench in the Garden of Saint-Paul Hospital	November 1889	São Paulo Museum of Art	39.5 x 47.5cm	F 732; JH 1842
Pine Trees against a Red Sky with Setting Sun	November 1889	Kröller-Müller Museum, Otterlo	92 x 73cm	F 652; JH 1843
The Garden of Saint-Paul Hospital with Figure	November 1889	Kröller-Müller Museum, Otterlo	61 x 50cm	F 733; JH 1845
Study of Pine Trees	November 1889	Kröller-Müller Museum, Otterlo	46 x 51cm	F 742; JH 1846
Landscape with Trees and Figures	November 1889	Baltimore Museum of Art	49.9 x 65.4cm	F 818; JH 1848
The Garden of Saint-Paul Hospital	November 1889	Museum Folkwang, Essen	73.1 x 92.6cm	F 660; JH 1849
Olive Grove: Orange Sky	November 1889	Gothenburg Museum of Art	74 x 93cm	F 586; JH 1854
Olive Grove: Pale Blue Sky	November 1889	Metropolitan Museum of Art, New York	72.7 x 92.1cm	F 708; JH 1855
Olive Trees with Yellow Sky and Sun	November 1889	Minneapolis Institute of Art	73.7 x 92.7cm	F 710; JH 1856
Olive Trees: Bright Blue Sky	November 1889	Scottish National Gallery, Edinburgh	49 x 63cm	F 714; JH 1858
The Large Plane Trees	November 1889	Cleveland Museum of Art	73.4 x 91.8cm	F 657; JH 1860
The Road Menders	November 1889	The Phillips Collection, Washington D.C.	71 x 93cm	F 658; JH 1861
Landscape with Olive Tree and Mountains in the Background	November 1889	Private collection	46.2 x 55.2cm	F 663; JH 1866
The Diggers	November–December 1889	Detroit Institute of Arts	65.1 x 50.2cm	F 701; JH 1847
Olive Grove	November–December 1889	Van Gogh Museum, Amsterdam	73 x 92cm	F 707; JH 1857
Wheat Field Behind Saint-Paul Hospital	November–December 1889	Virginia Museum of Fine Arts, Richmond	24 x 33.7cm	F 722; JH 1872
Olive Trees against a Slope of a Hill	November–December 1889	Van Gogh Museum, Amsterdam	33.5 x 40cm	F 716; JH 1878
The Garden of Saint-Paul Hospital	December 1889	Van Gogh Museum, Amsterdam	71.5 x 90.5cm	F 659; JH 1850
Olive Grove with Picking Figures	December 1889	Kröller-Müller Museum, Otterlo	73 x 92cm	F 587; JH 1853
Enclosed Field with Rising Sun	December 1889	Private collection	71 x 90.5cm	F 737; JH 1862
A Meadow in the Mountains: Le Mas de Saint-Paul	December 1889	Kröller-Müller Museum, Otterlo	73 x 91.5cm	F 721; JH 1864
The White Cottage Among the Olive Trees	December 1889	Private collection	70 x 60cm	F 664; JH 1865
Olive Picking	December 1889	Goulandris Museum of Contemporary Art	73 x 92cm	F 654; JH 1868
Olive Picking	December 1889	Metropolitan Museum of Art, New York	72.4 x 89.9cm	F 655; JH 1869
Olive Picking	December 1889	National Gallery of Art, Washington D.C.	73 x 92cm	F 656; JH 1870
The Ravine of the Peyroulets	December 1889	Kröller-Müller Museum, Otterlo	72 x 92cm	F 661; JH 1871
Landscape in the Neighbourhood of Saint-Rémy	December 1889	Unknown	33 x 41cm	F 726; JH 1874
A Road at Saint-Remy with Female Figure	December 1889	Kasama Nichidō Museum of Art, Kasama	32.2 x 40.5cm	F 728; JH 1875
Field with Two Rabbits	December 1889	Van Gogh Museum, Amsterdam	32.5 x 40.5cm	F 739; JH 1876
Valley with Ploughman Seen from Above	December 1889	Hermitage Museum, Saint Petersburg	33 x 41cm	F 727; JH 1877
Morning: Peasant Couple Going to Work, after Millet	January 1890	Hermitage Museum, Saint Petersburg	73 x 92cm	F 684; JH 1880
The Siesta, after Millet	January 1890	Musée d'Orsay, Paris	73 x 91cm	F 686; JH 1881
The Plough and the Harrow, after Millet	January 1890	Van Gogh Museum, Amsterdam	72 x 92cm	F 632; JH 1882
First Steps, after Millet	January 1890	Metropolitan Museum of Art, New York	72.4 x 91.2cm	F 668; JH 1883
The Drinkers, after Daumier	February 1890	Art Institute of Chicago	59.4 x 73.4cm	F 667; JH 1884
Prisoners' Round, after Doré	February 1890	Pushkin Museum, Moscow	80 x 64cm	F 669; JH 1885
The Woodcutter, after Millet	February 1890	Van Gogh Museum, Amsterdam	43.5 x 25cm	F 670; JH 1886
Cypresses and Two Women	February 1890	Van Gogh Museum, Amsterdam	43.5 x 27cm	F 621; JH 1888
Almond Blossoms	February 1890	Van Gogh Museum, Amsterdam	73.5 x 92cm	F 671; JH 1891
L'Arlésienne (Madame Ginoux)	February 1890	Galleria Nazionale d'Arte Moderna, Rome	60 x 50cm	F 540; JH 1892
L'Arlésienne (Madame Ginoux)	February 1890	Kröller-Müller Museum, Otterlo	65 x 49cm	F 541; JH 1893
L'Arlésienne (Madame Ginoux)	February 1890	São Paulo Museum of Art	65 x 54cm	F 542; JH 1894
L'Arlésienne (Madame Ginoux)	February 1890	Private collection	65 x 54cm	F 543; JH 1895
Thatched Cottages in the Sunshine: Reminiscence of the North	February 1890	Barnes Foundation, Philadelphia	50 x 39cm	F 674; JH 1920
Cottages: Reminiscence of the North	March–April 1890	Private collection	45.5 x 43cm	F 673; JH 1919
Cottages and Cypresses: Reminiscence of the North	March–April 1890	Van Gogh Museum, Amsterdam	Oil on canvas on panel 29 x 36.5cm	F 675; JH 1921
Peasants Lifting Potatoes	March–April 1890	Private collection	32 x 40.5cm	F 694; JH 1922
Two Peasants Women Digging in Fields with Snow	March–April 1890	Foundation E.G. Bührle, Zürich	50 x 64cm	F 695; JH 1923
At Eternity's Gate	April–May 1890	Kröller-Müller Museum, Otterlo	81 x 65cm	F 702; JH 1967
Pine Trees and Dandelions in the Garden of Saint-Paul Hospital	April–May 1890	Kröller-Müller Museum, Otterlo	72 x 90cm	F 676; JH 1970
Wild Roses	April–May 1890	Van Gogh Museum, Amsterdam	24.5 x 33cm	F 597; JH 2011
Roses and Beetle	April–May 1890	Van Gogh Museum, Amsterdam	33.5 x 24.5cm	F 749; JH 2012
Poppies and Butterflies	April–May 1890	Van Gogh Museum, Amsterdam	34.5 x 25.5cm	F 748; JH 2013
The Raising of Lazarus, after Rembrandt	May 1890	Van Gogh Museum, Amsterdam	50 x 65cm	F 677; JH 1972
The Good Samaritan, after Delacroix	May 1890	Kröller-Müller Museum, Otterlo	73 x 60cm	F 633; JH 1974
Meadow with Butterflies	May 1890	National Gallery, London	64.5 x 81cm	F 672; JH 1975
Still Life: Vase with Pink Roses	May 1890	National Gallery of Art, Washington D.C.	71 x 90cm	F 681; JH 1976
Still Life: Vase with Irises Against a Yellow Background	May 1890	Van Gogh Museum, Amsterdam	92 x 73.5cm	F 678; JH 1977
Still Life: Vase with Irises	May 1890	Metropolitan Museum of Art, New York	73.7 x 92.1cm	F 680; JH 1978
Still Life: Pink Roses in a Vase	May 1890	Metropolitan Museum of Art, New York	92.6 x 73.7cm	F 682; JH 1979
Green Wheat Fields	May 1890	National Gallery of Art, Washington D.C.	73 x 93cm	F 807; JH 1980
Landscape with Couple Walking and Crescent Moon	May 1890	São Paulo Museum of Art	49.5 x 45.5cm	F 704; JH 1981
Road with Cypress and Star	May 1890	Kröller-Müller Museum, Otterlo	92 x 73cm	F 683; JH 1982

== Paintings (Auvers-sur-Oise) ==
Image, Title	Date	Current location	Medium, Dimensions	Catalogue No.
Thatched Cottages and Houses	May 1890	Hermitage Museum, Saint Petersburg	60 x 73cm	F 750; JH 1984
Houses in Auvers	May 1890	Museum of Fine Arts, Boston	72 x 60.5cm	F 805; JH 1989
Chestnut Tree in Blossom	May 1890	Kröller-Müller Museum, Otterlo	63 x 50.5cm	F 752; JH 1991
Chestnut Tree in Blossom	May 1890	Private collection	70 x 58cm	F 751; JH 1992
The House of Père Pilon	May 1890	Private collection	49 x 70cm	F 791; JH 1995
Doctor Gachet's Garden in Auvers	May 1890	Musée d'Orsay, Paris	73 x 51.5cm	F 755; JH 1999
Street in Auvers	May 1890	Ateneum, Helsinki	73 x 92cm	F 802; JH 2001
The House of Père Eloi	May 1890	Private collection	51 x 58cm	F 794; JH 2002
View of Vessenots Near Auvers	May 1890	Thyssen-Bornemisza Museum, Madrid	55 x 65cm	F 797; JH 2003
Blossoming Chestnut Branches	May 1890	Foundation E.G. Bührle, Zürich	72 x 91cm	F 820; JH 2010
Village Street and Steps in Auvers with Figures	May 1890	Saint Louis Art Museum	49.8 x 70.1cm	F 795; JH 2111
View of Auvers	May–June 1890	Van Gogh Museum, Amsterdam	50 x 52cm	F 799; JH 2004
Farmhouse with Two Figures	May–June 1890	Van Gogh Museum, Amsterdam	38 x 45cm	F 806; JH 2017
Village Street and Steps in Auvers with Two Figures	May–June 1890	Private collection	20.5 x 26cm	F 796; JH 2110
Thatched Cottages at Cordeville	June 1890	Musée d'Orsay, Paris	72 x 91cm	F 792; JH 1987
Houses at Auvers	June 1890	Toledo Museum of Art	60.6 x 73cm	F 759; JH 1988
Marguerite Gachet in the Garden	June 1890	Musée d'Orsay, Paris	46 x 55cm	F 756; JH 2005
The Church at Auvers	June 1890	Musée d'Orsay, Paris	94 x 74cm	F 789; JH 2006
Portrait of Dr. Gachet †	June 1890	Private collection	67 x 56cm	F 753; JH 2007
Pink Roses	June 1890	Ny Carlsberg Glyptotek, Copenhagen	32 x 40.5cm	F 595; JH 2009
Portrait of Dr. Gachet	June 1890	Musée d'Orsay, Paris	68 x 57cm	F 754; JH 2014
Blossoming Acacia Branches	June 1890	Nationalmuseum, Stockholm	32.5 x 24cm	F 821; JH 2015
Thatched Cottages in Jorgus	June 1890	Private collections	33 x 40.5cm	F 758; JH 2016
Wheat Field at Auvers with White House	June 1890	The Phillips Collection, Washington D.C.	48.6 x 83.2cm	F 804; JH 2018
Landscape with a Carriage and a Train	June 1890	Pushkin Museum, Moscow	72 x 90cm	F 760; JH 2019
Vineyards with a View of Auvers	June 1890	Saint Louis Art Museum	64.2 x 79.5cm	F 762; JH 2020
The Little Stream	June 1890	Private collection	25.5 x 40cm	F 740; JH 2022
Poppy Field	June 1890	Kunstmuseum Den Haag, The Hague	73 x 91.5cm	F 636; JH 2027
Daubigny's Garden	June 1890	Van Gogh Museum, Amsterdam	50.7 x 50.7cm	F 765; JH 2029
Wild Flowers and Thistles in a Vase	June 1890	Private collection	67 x 47cm	F 763; JH 2030
White House at Night	June 1890	Hermitage Museum, Saint Petersburg	59.5 x 73cm	F 766; JH 2031
Still Life: Red Poppies and Daisies	June 1890	Private collection	65 x 50cm	F 280; JH 2032
Still Life: Glass with Wild Flowers	June 1890	Private collection	41 x 34cm	F 589; JH 2033
Ears of Wheat	June 1890	Van Gogh Museum, Amsterdam	64.5 x 48.5cm	F 767; JH 2034
Portrait of Adeline Ravoux	June 1890	Private collection	67 x 55cm	F 768; JH 2035
Portrait of Adeline Ravoux	June 1890	Cleveland Museum of Art	52 x 52cm	F 786; JH 2036
Portrait of Adeline Ravoux	June 1890	Private collection	73.7 x 54.7cm	F 769; JH 2037
Wheat Fields near Auvers	June 1890	Österreichische Galerie Belvedere, Vienna	50 x 101.1cm	F 775; JH 2038
Landscape with the Chateau of Auvers at Sunset	June 1890	Van Gogh Museum, Amsterdam	50 x 101cm	F 770; JH 2040
Undergrowth with Two Figures	June 1890	Cincinnati Art Museum	50 x 100.5cm	F 773; JH 2041
Still Life: Glass with Carnations	June 1890	Private collection	41 x 32cm	F 598; JH 2043
Still Life: Vase with Flower and Thistles	June 1890	Pola Museum of Art, Hakone	41 x 34cm	F 599; JH 2044
Still Life: Japanese Vase with Roses and Anemones	June 1890	Musée d'Orsay, Paris	51 x 51cm	F 764; JH 2045
Still Life: Vase with Rose-Mallows	June 1890	Van Gogh Museum, Amsterdam	42 x 29cm	F 764a JH 2046
Marguerite Gachet at the Piano	June 1890	Kunstmuseum Basel	102.6 x 50cm	F 772; JH 2048
Young Man with Cornflower	June 1890	Private collection	40.5 x 32cm	F 787; JH 2050
Two Children	June 1890	Musée d'Orsay, Paris	51.2 x 51cm	F 783; JH 2051
Two Children	June 1890	Private collection	51.5 x 46.5cm	F 784; JH 2052
Peasant Woman Against a Background of Wheat	June 1890	Private collection	92 x 73cm	F 774; JH 2053
Girl in White	June 1890	National Gallery of Art, Washington, D.C.	66 x 45cm	F 788; JH 2055
The Little Arlesienne	June 1890	Kröller-Müller Museum, Otterlo	51 x 49cm	F 518; JH 2056
Child with Orange	June 1890	Private collection	50 x 51cm	F 785; JH 2057
Garden in Auvers	June–July 1890	Private collection	64 x 80cm	F 814; JH 2107
The Grove	July 1890	Private collection	73 x 92cm	F 817; JH 1319
Wheat Field with Sheaves and Reaper	July 1890	Toledo Museum of Art	73.6 x 93cm	F 559; JH 1479
The Bank of Oise at Auvers	July 1890	Detroit Institute of Arts	73.3 x 93.6cm	F 798; JH 2021
The Cows, after Jordaens	July 1890	Palais des Beaux-Arts de Lille	55 x 65cm	F 822; JH 2095
Landscape at Auvers in the Rain	July 1890	National Museum Cardiff	50 x 100cm	F 811; JH 2096
Wheat Field under Clouded Sky	July 1890	Van Gogh Museum, Amsterdam	50 x 100.5cm	F 778; JH 2097
Field with Wheat Stacks	July 1890	Van Gogh Museum, Amsterdam	50 x 100cm	F 809; JH 2098
Plain near Auvers	July 1890	Neue Pinakothek, Munich	73.3 x 92cm	F 782; JH 2099
Wheat Fields	July 1890	Private collection	50 x 40cm	F 812; JH 2101
Wheat Fields at Auvers under Clouded Sky	July 1890	Carnegie Museum of Art, Pittsburgh	73 x 92cm	F 781; JH 2102
Daubigny's Garden	July 1890	Hiroshima Museum of Art	53 x 103cm	F 776; JH 2104
Daubigny's Garden	July 1890	Kunstmuseum Basel	50 x 101.5cm	F 777; JH 2105
The Town Hall at Auvers	July 1890	Private collection	72 x 93cm	F 790; JH 2108
Two Women Crossing the Fields	July 1890	McNay Art Museum, San Antonio	Oil on paper on canvas 32 x 64cm	F 819; JH 2112
Tree Roots	July 1890	Van Gogh Museum, Amsterdam	50 x 100cm	F 816; JH 2113
Farms near Auvers	July 1890	Tate, London	50.2 x 100.3cm	F 793; JH 2114
Thatched Sandstone Cottages in Chaponval	July 1890	Kunsthaus Zürich	65 x 81cm	F 780; JH 2115
Wheatfield with Crows	July 1890	Van Gogh Museum, Amsterdam	50.5 x 103cm	F 779; JH 2117
Wheat Field with Cornflowers	July 1890	Private collection	60 x 81cm	F 808; JH 2118
The Fields	July 1890	Private collection	50 x 65cm	F 761; JH 2120
Haystacks under a Rainy Sky	July 1890	Kröller-Müller Museum, Otterlo	64 x 52.5cm	F 563; JH 2121
View of Auvers with Church	July 1890	Rhode Island School of Design Museum, Providence	34 x 42cm	F 800; JH 2122
Wheat Fields with Auvers in the Background	July 1890	Private collection	43 x 50cm	F 801; JH 2123
Sheaves of Wheat	July 1890	Dallas Museum of Art	50.5 x 101cm	F 771; JH 2125

== Watercolours ==
Image, Title	Date	Current location	Created in	Catalogue No.
Coalmine in the Borinage	July–August 1879	Van Gogh Museum, Amsterdam	Cuesmes	F 1040; JH 100
Landscape	April–May 1881	Saint Louis Art Museum, St. Louis	Etten	F 874v JH 3
Garden with Arbor	June 1881	Kröller-Müller Museum, Otterlo	Etten	F 902; JH 9
Windmills near Dordrecht	August 1881	Kröller-Müller Museum, Otterlo	Etten	F 850; JH 15
Woman Peeling Pototoes near a Window	September 1881	Kröller-Müller Museum, Otterlo	Etten	F 1209; JH 22
Woman Peeling Pototoes near a Window	September 1881	Kröller-Müller Museum, Otterlo	Etten	F 1213; JH 23
Man with Winnow	September 1881	Kröller-Müller Museum, Otterlo	Etten	F 891; JH 24
Sower with Basket	September 1881	Kröller-Müller Museum, Otterlo	Etten	F 865; JH 25
Sower	September 1881	Private collection	Etten	F 866a JH 27
Digger	September 1881	Kröller-Müller Museum, Otterlo	Etten	F 859; JH 29
Peasant Sitting by the Fireplace ("Worn Out")	September 1881	Private collection	Etten	F 863; JH 34
Farmer Leaning on his Spade	September 1881	Kröller-Müller Museum, Otterlo	Etten	F 861; JH 40
Digger	September 1881	Kröller-Müller Museum, Otterlo	Etten	F 855; JH 43
Man with Broom	October 1881	Kröller-Müller Museum, Otterlo	Etten	F 890; JH 45
Peasant Sitting by the Fireplace ("Worn Out")	October 1881	Private collection	Etten	F 864; JH 51
Peasant woman Sowing with a Basket	October 1881	Private collection	Etten	F 883; JH 53
Digger	October 1881	Van Gogh Museum, Amsterdam	Etten	F 886; JH 54
Pollard Willow	October 1881	Private collection	Etten	F 995; JH 56
Peasant Girl Raking	October 1881	Centraal Museum, Utrecht	Etten	F 884; JH 57
Boy Cutting Grass with a Sickle	October 1881	Kröller-Müller Museum, Otterlo	Etten	F 851; JH 61
Farmer Sitting at the Fireside, Reading	October 1881	Kröller-Müller Museum, Otterlo	Etten	F 897; JH 63
Woman Sitting at the Fireside	October 1881	Kröller-Müller Museum, Otterlo	Etten	F 1216; JH 64
Woman Peeling Potatoes	October 1881	Kröller-Müller Museum, Otterlo	Etten	F 854; JH 66
Woman Sewing	October 1881	Unknown	Etten	F 867; JH 67
Woman Mending Stockings	October 1881	Kröller-Müller Museum, Otterlo	Etten	F 888; JH 68
Woman Sewing	October 1881	Private collection	Etten	F 886; JH 69
Woman Sewing	October 1881	Kröller-Müller Museum, Otterlo	Etten	F 1221; JH 70
Woman Sewing	October 1881	Kröller-Müller Museum, Otterlo	Etten	F 885; JH 71
Woman Churning Butter	October 1881	Kröller-Müller Museum, Otterlo	Etten	F 892; JH 72
Young Woman Sewing	October 1881	Kröller-Müller Museum, Otterlo	Etten	F 887; JH 73
Mother at the Cradle and Child Sitting on the Floor	October 1881	Kröller-Müller Museum, Otterlo	Etten	F 1070; JH 74
Girl with Black Cap Sitting on the Ground	November 1881	Kröller-Müller Museum, Otterlo	Etten	F 873; JH 79
Scheveningen Woman Sewing	December 1881	P. and N. de Boer Foundation, Amsterdam	Etten	F 869; JH 83
Scheveningen Woman Knitting	December 1881	Private collection	Etten	F 870; JH 84
Scheveningen Woman	December 1881	Van Gogh Museum	Etten	F 871; JH 85
Scheveningen Woman	December 1881	Getty Center, Los Angeles	The Hague	F 946v JH 95
Woman Grinding Coffee	January 1882	Private collection	The Hague	F 889; JH 75
Woman at the Window Knitting	January 1882	Private collection	The Hague	F 910a JH 90
View of the Hague with the New Church	January 1882	Private collection	The Hague	F 1680; JH 97
Barren Field	January 1882	Unknown	The Hague	F 904; JH 98
Meadows near Rijswijk and the Schenkweg	February 1882	Private collection	Etten	F 910; JH 99
Tree Roots in a Sandy Ground	April–May 1882	Kröller-Müller Museum, Otterlo	The Hague	F 933r JH 142
Fish Drying Barn	June 1882	Private collection	Etten	F 945; JH 160
The 'Laakmolen' near The Hague	July 1882	Private collection	Etten	F 844; JH 59
Rooftops	July 1882	Private collection	The Hague	F 943; JH 156
Bleaching Ground	July 1882	Getty Center, Los Angeles	The Hague	F 946; JH 158
Diggers in Schenweg	July 1882	Private collection	The Hague	F 927; JH 161
Meadow, In the Background New Church	July 1882	Private collection	The Hague	F 916; JH 162
Pollard Willow	July 1882	Van Gogh Museum, Amsterdam	The Hague	F 947; JH 164
Iron Mill in the Hague	July 1882	Private collection	The Hague	F 926; JH 166
Country Lane with Trees	July 1882	Unknown	The Hague	F 1088; JH 168
Woman with White Shawl in a Field	July 1882	Private collection	The Hague	F 949; JH 169
Four Men Cutting Wood	July 1882	Kröller-Müller Museum, Otterlo	The Hague	F 950; JH 170
Scheveningen Women and Other People Under Umbrellas	July 1882	Gemeentemuseum Den Haag, The Hague	The Hague	F 990; JH 172
View of Scheveningen	Summer 1882	Van Gogh Museum, Amsterdam	The Hague	F 1041; JH 167
Waiting Room	September 1882	Private collection	The Hague	F 909; JH 94
Four People on a Bench	September 1882	Van Gogh Museum, Amsterdam	The Hague	JH 195
Bench with Three Persons	September 1882	Private collection	The Hague	F 1039; JH 196
Bench with Four Persons (and Baby)	September 1882	Private collection	The Hague	F 951; JH 197
Woman Spreading Out Laundry on a Field	September 1882	Private collection	The Hague	F 1087; JH 200
Sien Nursing Baby	September 1882	Private collection	The Hague	F 1068; JH 219
Woman with Baby on her Lap, Half-Figure	September 1882	Kröller-Müller Museum, Otterlo	The Hague	F 1061; JH 220
Woman with a Broom	September 1882	Van Gogh Museum, Amsterdam	The Hague	F 1075; JH 224
Church Pew with Worshippers	September 1882	Kröller-Müller Museum, Otterlo	The Hague	F 967; JH 225
People Strolling on the Beach	September 1882	Baltimore Museum of Art	The Hague	F 1038; JH 228
Beach with People Walking and Boats	September 1882	Private collection	The Hague	F 982; JH 247
Woman with a Broom	September 1882	Van Gogh Museum, Amsterdam	The Hague	F 1074; JH 249
Women Miners	September 1882	Kröller-Müller Museum, Otterlo	The Hague	F 994; JH 253
The State Lottery	September–October 1882	Van Gogh Museum, Amsterdam	The Hague	F 970; JH 222
Potato Market	September–October 1882	Private collection	The Hague	F 1091; JH 252
Miners in the Snow: Winter	October 1882	Van Gogh Museum, Amsterdam	The Hague	F 1202; JH 229
Orchard in Blossom with Two Figures: Spring	October 1882	Van Gogh Museum, Amsterdam	The Hague	F 1245; JH 230
The Bookseller Blok	November 1882	Van Gogh Museum	The Hague	F 993; JH 254
Woman with Shawl, Umbrella and Basket	November 1882	Private collection	The Hague	F 934; JH 255
Woman with Dark Cap	December 1882	Groninger Museum, Groningen	The Hague	F 1057; JH 294
Woman with Folded Hands, Half-Length	March 1883	Kröller-Müller Museum, Otterlo	The Hague	F 1179; JH 324
The Soup Kitchen	March 1883	Private collection	The Hague	F 1020b JH 331
Snowy Yard	March 1883	Private collection	The Hague	F 1022; JH 344
Woman with Shawl, Sewing	March 1883	Kröller-Müller Museum, Otterlo	The Hague	F 1033; JH 353
Woman on Her Deathbed	April 1883	Kröller-Müller Museum, Otterlo	The Hague	F 841; JH 359
Scheveningen Woman with Wheelbarrow	May 1883	Kröller-Müller Museum, Otterlo	The Hague	F 1021; JH 362
Weed Burner, Sitting on a Wheelbarrow with his Wife	July 1883	Museum Voorlinden, Wassenaar	The Hague	F 1035a JH 375
Landscape with a Stack of Peat and Farmhouses	September 1883	Van Gogh Museum, Amsterdam	Drenthe	F 1099; JH 399
Landscape with Wheelbarrow	September 1883	Cleveland Museum of Art	The Hague	F 1100; JH 400
Peatery in Drenthe	October 1883	Museo Soumaya, Mexico City	Drenthe	F 1094; JH 398
Landscape with a Farm	October 1883	Private collection	Drenthe	F 1101; JH 401
Farmhouse	October 1883	Private collection	Drenthe	F 1102; JH 402
Group of Farmhouses	October 1883	Von der Heydt Museum, Wuppertal	Drenthe	F 1103; JH 403
Drawbridge in Nieuw-Amsterdam	November 1883	Groninger Museum, Groningen	Drenthe	F 1098; JH 425
Landscape with Trees	Autumn 1883	Private Collection	Drenthe	JH Add. 21
Interior with a Weaver Facing Right	December 1883	Kröller-Müller Museum, Otterlo	Nuenen	F 1110; JH 437
Lumber Sale	December 1883	Van Gogh Museum, Amsterdam	Nuenen	F 1113; JH 438
Weaver	December 1883	Van Gogh Museum, Amsterdam	Nuenen	F 1114; JH 444
Weaver	December 1883	Van Gogh Museum, Amsterdam	Nuenen	F 1107; JH 445
Weaver	December 1883	Van Gogh Museum, Amsterdam	Nuenen	F 1125; JH 448
Weaver	December 1883	Van Gogh Museum, Amsterdam	Nuenen	F 1116av JH 499
Weaver	December 1883	Van Gogh Museum, Amsterdam	Nuenen	F 1115; JH 502
Three Woodcutters Walking	January 1884	Cincinnati Art Museum, Cincinnati	Nuenen	F 948; JH 171
Weaver Facing Right, Interior with One Window and High Chair	January 1884	Kuboso Memorial Museum of Arts, Izumi	Nuenen	F 1119; JH 449
Weaver Facing Right	February 1884	Louvre, Paris	Nuenen	F 1108; JH 451
Weaver, Arranging Threads	May 1884	Van Gogh Museum, Amsterdam	Nuenen	F 1688; JH 482
Man Winding Yarn	May 1884	Van Gogh Museum, Amsterdam	Nuenen	F 1140; JH 487
Woman Reeling Yarn	May 1884	Van Gogh Museum, Amsterdam	Nuenen	F 1139; JH 494
Woman Reeling Yarn	May 1884	Van Gogh Museum, Amsterdam	Nuenen	F 68; JH 495
Wood Gatherer, Figure Study	August 1884	Private collection	Nuenen	F 1081; JH 515
Water Mill at Gennep	November 1884	Unknown	Nuenen	F 1144a JH 523
Peasant Woman, Head	December 1884	Private collection	Nuenen	F 1194; JH 588
Sale of Building Scrap	May 1885	Van Gogh Museum, Amsterdam	Nuenen	F 1230; JH 770
Peasant Man and Woman, Digging	August 1885	Kröller-Müller Museum, Otterlo	Nuenen	F 1299; JH 874
Two Women Talking to Each Other While Digging	August 1885	Private collection	Nuenen	F 1296; JH 877
Woman by a Hearth	August 1885	Private collection	Nuenen	F 1222; JH 895
Woman with Kettle by the Fireplace	August 1885	Staatsgalerie Stuttgart	Nuenen	F 1293; JH 896
A Sunday in Eindhoven	September 1885	Van Gogh Museum, Amsterdam	Nuenen	F 1348; JH 958
Parsonage Garden at Nuenen with Pond and Figures	November 1885	Private collection	Nuenen	F 1234; JH 954
The Moulin de Blute-Fin	1886	Private collection	Paris	F 1397; JH 1173
Entrance to the Moulin de la Galette	1887	Van Gogh Museum, Amsterdam	Paris	F 1406; JH 1277
The Ramparts of Paris	1887	Private collection	Paris	F 1402; JH 1280
The Ramparts of Paris	1887	Whitworth Art Gallery, Manchester	Paris	F 1403; JH 1281
Road Running Beside the Paris Ramparts	1887	Van Gogh Museum, Amsterdam	Paris	F 1400; JH 1283
Gate in the Paris Ramparts	1887	Van Gogh Museum, Amsterdam	Paris	F 1401; JH 1284
Outskirts of Paris near Montmartre	1887	Stedelijk Museum, Amsterdam	Paris	F 1410; JH 1286
Shed with Sunflowers	1887	Van Gogh Museum, Amsterdam	Paris	F 1411; JH 1305
Langlois Bridge at Arles	April 1888	Private collection	Arles	F 1480; JH 1382
Pink Peach Trees	April 1888	Van Gogh Museum, Amsterdam	Arles	F 1469; JH 1384
Harvest in Provence, at the Left Montmajour	June 1888	Fogg Museum, Harvard University	Arles	F 1484; JH 1438
Harvest Landscape	June 1888	Private collection	Arles	F 1483; JH 1439
Haystacks near a Farm	June 1888	Private Collection; Auctioned Nov 2021	Arles	F 1425; JH 1441
Fishing Boats on the Beach	June 1888	Private collection	Arles	F 1429; JH 1459
The Zouave	June 1888	Metropolitan Museum of Art, New York	Arles	F 1482; JH 1487
The Mill of Alphonse Daudet at Fontvieille	July 1888	Private collection	Arles	F 1464; JH 1497
The Night Café	September 1888	Private collection	Arles	F 1463; JH 1576
The Yellow House	September 1888	Van Gogh Museum, Amsterdam	Arles	F 1413; JH 1591
Breton Women, after Émile Bernard	December 1888	Galleria d'Arte Moderna	Arles	F 1422; JH 1654
Flowering Shrubs	May 1889	Private collection	Saint-Rémy	F 1526; JH 1707
Flowering Shrubs	May 1889	Kröller-Müller Museum, Otterlo	Saint-Rémy	F 1527; JH 1708
Trees and Shrubs	May 1889	Van Gogh Museum, Amsterdam	Saint-Rémy	F 1533; JH 1710
Stone Bench in the Garden of the Asylum	May 1889	Van Gogh Museum, Amsterdam	Saint-Rémy	F 1537; JH 1711
Trees in the Garden of the Asylum	May 1889	Van Gogh Museum, Amsterdam	Saint-Rémy	F 1536; JH 1712
Stone Steps in the Garden of the Asylum	May 1889	Van Gogh Museum, Amsterdam	Saint-Rémy	F 1535; JH 1713
Corridor of Saint-Paul Asylum in Saint-Rémy	September 1889	Metropolitan Museum of Art, New York	Saint-Rémy	F 1529; JH 1808
The Entrance Hall of Saint-Paul Asylum in Saint-Rémy	October 1889	Van Gogh Museum, Amsterdam	Saint-Rémy	F 1530; JH 1806
Window of Vincent's Studio at the Asylum	October 1889	Van Gogh Museum, Amsterdam	Saint-Rémy	F 1528; JH 1807
Old Vineyard with Peasant Woman	May 1890	Van Gogh Museum, Amsterdam	Auvers-sur-Oise	F 1624; JH 1985
Landscape with Cottages	May 1890	Van Gogh Museum, Amsterdam	Auvers-sur-Oise	F 1640r JH 1986
Landscape with Bridge across the Oise	May 1890	Tate, London	Auvers-sur-Oise	F 1639; JH 2023

== Drawings ==
Van Gogh made more than a thousand drawings during his lifetime.

== Prints (Lithographs) ==
Image, Title	Date	Current location	Created in	Catalogue No.
Orphan Man	November 1882	Four known impressions Van Gogh Museum, Amsterdam (x2); Bibliotèque d'Art et d'Archéologie, Paris; National Gallery of Art, Washington D.C.	The Hague	F 1658; JH 256
Sorrow	November 1882	Three known impressions Van Gogh Museum, Amsterdam (x2); Museum of Modern Art, New York	The Hague	F 1655; JH 259
Digger	November 1882	Four known impressions Van Gogh Museum, Amsterdam (x2); Bibliotèque d'Art et d'Archéologie, Paris; Staatsgalerie Stuttgart	The Hague	F 1656; JH 262
Orphan Man with Top Hat, Drinking Coffee	November 1882	Three known impressions Van Gogh Museum, Amsterdam (x2); Unknown	The Hague	F 1657; JH 266
At Eternity's Gate	November 1882	Seven known impressions Van Gogh Museum, Amsterdam (x2); Tehran Museum of Contemporary Art; Kunsthalle Hamburg; Bibliotèque d'Art et d'Archéologie, Paris; Private collection (x2)	The Hague	F 1662; JH 268
Workman Sitting on a Basket, Cutting Bread	November 1882	Five known impressions Van Gogh Museum, Amsterdam (x2); Museum Boijmans Van Beuningen, Rotterdam; Unknown (x2)	The Hague	F 1663; JH 272
Weed Burner, Sitting on a Wheelbarrow with his Wife	July 1883	Four known impressions Van Gogh Museum, Amsterdam; Kröller-Müller Museum, Otterlo; Bibliotèque d'Art et d'Archéologie, Paris; Private collection	The Hague	F 1660; JH 377
Gardener near a Gnarled Apple Tree	July 1883	Five known impressions Van Gogh Museum, Amsterdam; Bibliothèque nationale de France, Paris; British Museum, London; Staatsgalerie Stuttgart; Private collection	The Hague	F 1669; JH 397
The Potato Eaters	April 1885	Eighteen known impressions Van Gogh Museum, Amsterdam (x7); Rijksmuseum, Amsterdam; Gemeentemuseum Den Haag, The Hague; Museo Thyssen-Bornemisza, Madrid; Museum of Modern Art, New York; Kröller-Müller Museum, Otterlo; Bibliothèque nationale de France, Paris; National Gallery of Art, Washington D.C. Private collection (x2); Unknown (x2)	Nuenen	F 1661; JH 737

== Prints (Etchings) ==
Image, Title	Date	Current location	Created in	Catalogue No.
Portrait of Doctor Gachet with a Pipe	May 1890	114 known impressions	Auvers-sur-Oise	F 1664; JH 2028

== Letter sketches ==
Image, Title	Date	Current location	Created in	Catalogue No.
Woman near a Window (twice), Man with Winnow, Sower, and Woman with Broom	September 1881	Van Gogh Museum, Amsterdam	Etten	JH 28
Digger	September 1881	Van Gogh Museum, Amsterdam	Etten	JH 30
Sower with Hand in Sack	September 1881	Van Gogh Museum, Amsterdam	Etten	JH 33
Peasant Sitting by the Fireplace ("Worn Out")	September 1881	Van Gogh Museum, Amsterdam	Etten	JH 35
Field in a Thunderstorm / Digger and Figure of a Woman	September 1881	Van Gogh Museum, Amsterdam	Etten	JH 37 & 39
Farmer Leaning on his Spade	September 1881	Van Gogh Museum, Amsterdam	Etten	JH 41
Road with Pollard Willows / Farmhouses on a Road with Trees	October 1881	Van Gogh Museum, Amsterdam	Etten	JH 48 & 49
Road with Pollard Willows	October 1881	Van Gogh Museum, Amsterdam	Etten	JH 50
Digger	October 1881	Van Gogh Museum, Amsterdam	Etten	JH 55
Road with Pollard Willows	October 1881	Van Gogh Museum, Amsterdam	Etten	JH 58
Man Putting Potatoes in a Sack	October 1881	Van Gogh Museum, Amsterdam	Etten	JH 60
Scheveningen Woman Sewing	December 1881	Van Gogh Museum, Amsterdam	Etten	JH 86
Scheveningen Woman Knitting	December 1881	Van Gogh Museum, Amsterdam	Etten	JH 87
Scheveningen Woman Standing	December 1881	Van Gogh Museum, Amsterdam	Etten	JH 88
Sculpture and Still Life with Cabbage and Clogs	December 1881	Van Gogh Museum, Amsterdam	Etten	JH 89
Girl near the Stove, Grinding Coffee	January 1882	Van Gogh Museum, Amsterdam	The Hague	JH 91
Woman at the Window Knitting	January 1882	Van Gogh Museum, Amsterdam	The Hague	JH 92
The Schenkweg	January 1882	Van Gogh Museum, Amsterdam	The Hague	JH 93
Scheveningen Woman Sewing	21 January 1882	Van Gogh Museum, Amsterdam	The Hague	JH 96
Old Woman Seen from Behind	3 March 1882	Van Gogh Museum, Amsterdam	The Hague	JH 110
Nude Woman, Half-Length ("The Great Lady")	April 1882	Van Gogh Museum, Amsterdam	The Hague	JH 128
Rooftops	23 July 1882	Van Gogh Museum, Amsterdam	The Hague	JH 157
Fishing Boats on the Beach	26 July 1882	Van Gogh Museum, Amsterdam	The Hague	JH 159
Bleaching Ground	26 July 1882	Van Gogh Museum, Amsterdam	The Hague	JH 163
Pollard Willow	1 August 1882	Van Gogh Museum, Amsterdam	The Hague	JH 165
Beach and Sea	10–12 August 1882	Van Gogh Museum, Amsterdam	The Hague	JH 174
Sunset over a Meadow	14 August 1882	Van Gogh Museum, Amsterdam	The Hague	JH 177
Beach and Boats	3 September 1882	Van Gogh Museum, Amsterdam	The Hague	JH 227
A Girl in a Wood	9 September 1882	Van Gogh Museum, Amsterdam	The Hague	JH 183
Woody Landscape after the Rain	9 September 1882	Van Gogh Museum, Amsterdam	The Hague	JH 191
Bench with Four Persons (and Baby)	12–14 September 1882	Van Gogh Museum, Amsterdam	The Hague	JH 198
Orphans	18 September 1882	Van Gogh Museum, Amsterdam	The Hague	JH 203
Group of People on the Beach with Fishing Boat Arriving	18 September 1882	Van Gogh Museum, Amsterdam	The Hague	JH 205
Beach with People Walking and Boats	27 September 1882	Van Gogh Museum, Amsterdam	The Hague	JH 248
State Lottery Office	1 October 1882	Van Gogh Museum, Amsterdam	The Hague	JH 223
Church Pew with Worshippers	1 October 1882	Van Gogh Museum, Amsterdam	The Hague	JH 226
People in the Studio	2 March 1883	Van Gogh Museum, Amsterdam	The Hague	JH 327
The Public Soup Kitchen	3 March 1883	Van Gogh Museum, Amsterdam	The Hague	JH 328
The Public Soup Kitchen	4 March 1883	Van Gogh Museum, Amsterdam	The Hague	JH 332
Girl Kneeling in Front of a Cradle	21–28 March 1883	Van Gogh Museum, Amsterdam	The Hague	JH 338
Man in a Village Inn	March 1883	Van Gogh Museum, Amsterdam	The Hague	JH 339
Snowy Yard	21–28 March 1883	Van Gogh Museum, Amsterdam	The Hague	JH 342
Woman Digging	21 May 1883	Private collection	The Hague	JH 337
Garbage Dump	4–5 June 1883	Van Gogh Museum, Amsterdam	The Hague	JH 369
Garbage Dump	4–5 June 1883	Van Gogh Museum, Amsterdam	The Hague	JH 370
Potato Grubbers, Four Figures	23–28 June 1883	Van Gogh Museum, Amsterdam	The Hague	JH 373
Weed Burner, Sitting on a Wheelbarrow with his Wife / Three Persons Returning from the Potato Field	11 July 1883	Van Gogh Museum, Amsterdam	The Hague	JH 376 & 378
Gardener near a Gnarled Apple Tree	13 July 1883	Van Gogh Museum, Amsterdam	The Hague	JH 380
Breakwater	29–30 July 1883	Van Gogh Museum, Amsterdam	The Hague	JH 381
Path to the Beach	29–30 July 1883	Van Gogh Museum, Amsterdam	The Hague	JH 382
Cemetery	17 September 1883	Van Gogh Museum, Amsterdam	Drenthe	JH 396
Women Working in the Peat	6–7 October 1883	Van Gogh Museum, Amsterdam	Drenthe	JH 410
Plowman with Two Women	13 October 1883	Van Gogh Museum, Amsterdam	Drenthe	JH 412
Stooping Woman in Landscape	13 October 1883	Van Gogh Museum, Amsterdam	Drenthe	JH 414
Workman beside a Mound of Peat, and a Peat Boat with Two Figures	22 October 1883	Van Gogh Museum, Amsterdam	Drenthe	JH 416
Peasant Burning Weeds, and Farmhouse at Night	22 October 1883	Van Gogh Museum, Amsterdam	Drenthe	JH 419
Man Pulling a Harrow	28 October 1883	Van Gogh Museum, Amsterdam	Drenthe	JH 420
Plowman with Stooping Woman, and a Little Farmhouse with Piles of Peat	November 1883	Van Gogh Museum, Amsterdam	Drenthe	JH 422
Gardener with a Wheelbarrow	January 1884	Van Gogh Museum, Amsterdam	Nuenen	JH 440
Interior with Woman Sewing	January 1884	Van Gogh Museum, Amsterdam	Nuenen	JH 441
Weaver Facing Left	January 1884	Van Gogh Museum, Amsterdam	Nuenen	JH 442
Church in Nuenen, with One Figure	24 January 1884	Van Gogh Museum, Amsterdam	Nuenen	JH 447
Parsonage with Flowering Trees	April 1884	Van Gogh Museum, Amsterdam	Nuenen	JH 476
Old Man Reeling Yarn	June 1884	Van Gogh Museum, Amsterdam	Nuenen	JH 498
Wheat Harvest	August 1884	Van Gogh Museum, Amsterdam	Nuenen	JH 508
Peasant Woman, Head	January–February 1885	Van Gogh Museum, Amsterdam	Nuenen	JH 628
Peasant Woman, Seen against the Window, Head and Whole Figure	March 1885	Van Gogh Museum, Amsterdam	Nuenen	JH 713
Peasant Woman, Seen against the Window, Two Heads	March 1885	Van Gogh Museum, Amsterdam	Nuenen	JH 714
Peasant Women, Two Heads	April 1885	Van Gogh Museum, Amsterdam	Nuenen	JH 723
Honesty in a Vase	1 April 1885	Van Gogh Museum, Amsterdam	Nuenen	JH 726
Peasant Man and Woman Planting Potatoes	9 April 1885	Van Gogh Museum, Amsterdam	Nuenen	JH 728
Five Persons at a Meal	11 April 1885	Van Gogh Museum, Amsterdam	Nuenen	JH 735
Three Persons Sitting at the Window	May 1885	Van Gogh Museum, Amsterdam	Nuenen	JH 776
Gordina de Groot, Head	15 May 1885	Van Gogh Museum, Amsterdam	Nuenen	JH 784
Two Peasant Women Digging	August 1885	Van Gogh Museum, Amsterdam	Nuenen	JH 879
Bird's Nest	October 1885	Van Gogh Museum, Amsterdam	Nuenen	JH 943
Lane with Poplars	November 1885	Van Gogh Museum, Amsterdam	Nuenen	JH 960
The Seine with the Pont de Clichy	1887	Van Gogh Museum, Amsterdam	Paris	JH 1324
Drawbridge with Walking Couple	15 March 1888	Morgan Library & Museum, New York	Arles	JH 1370
Orchard Surrounded by Cypresses	9 April 1888	Morgan Library & Museum, New York	Arles	JH 1390
Three Orchards	13 April 1888	Van Gogh Museum, Amsterdam	Arles	JH 1393
Little Blossoming Pear Tree	13 April 1888	Van Gogh Museum, Amsterdam	Arles	JH 1395
Orchard and House with Orange Roof	21 April 1888	Van Gogh Museum, Amsterdam	Arles	JH 1400
Orchard and House with Orange Roof	21 April 1888	Morgan Library & Museum, New York	Arles	JH 1401
Vincent's House	1 May 1888	Van Gogh Museum, Amsterdam	Arles	JH 1413
Farmhouse with Wheat Field along a Road and Field with Flowers	12 May 1888	Van Gogh Museum, Amsterdam	Arles	JH 1418
Still Life with Coffee Pot	20 May 1888	Van Gogh Museum, Amsterdam	Arles	JH 1427
Still Life with Coffee Pot	6–11 June 1888	Morgan Library & Museum, New York	Arles	JH 1428
Fishing Boats on the Beach	6–11 June 1888	Morgan Library & Museum, New York	Arles	JH 1461
Street in Saintes-Maries	6–11 June 1888	Morgan Library & Museum, New York	Arles	JH 1463
Fishing Boats at Sea, Landscape with Edge of a Road, and a Farm along a Road	6–11 June 1888	Morgan Library & Museum, New York	Arles	JH 1464
Sower with Setting Sun	17 June 1888	Solomon R. Guggenheim Museum, New York	Arles	JH 1471
Sower with Setting Sun	18 June 1888	Morgan Library & Museum, New York	Arles	JH 1472
Wheat Field with Setting Sun	18 June 1888	Morgan Library & Museum, New York	Arles	JH 1474
Newly Mowed Lawn with Weeping Tree	5 July 1888	Van Gogh Museum, Amsterdam	Arles	JH 1500
Garden with Flowers	19 July 1888	Van Gogh Museum, Amsterdam	Arles	JH 1511
Quay with Men Unloading Sand Barges	14 August 1888	Van Gogh Museum, Amsterdam	Arles	JH 1557
Ploughed Field	26 September 1888	Private collection	Arles	JH 1587
Round Clipped Shrub in the Public Garden	2 October 1888	Van Gogh Museum, Amsterdam	Arles	JH 1584
The Starry Night	2 October 1888	Van Gogh Museum, Amsterdam	Arles	JH 1594
Public Garden with a Couple and a Blue Fir Tree	13 October 1888	Van Gogh Museum, Amsterdam	Arles	JH 1602
The Tarascon Stagecoach	13 October 1888	Van Gogh Museum, Amsterdam	Arles	JH 1606
The Viaduct and the Trinquetaille Bridge	13 October 1888	Van Gogh Museum, Amsterdam	Arles	JH 1607
Vincent's Bedroom in Arles	October 1888	Van Gogh Museum, Amsterdam	Arles	JH 1609
Vincent's Bedroom	17 October 1888	Morgan Library & Museum, New York	Arles	JH 1610
A Lane of Cypresses with a Couple Walking	21 October 1888	Van Gogh Museum, Amsterdam	Arles	JH 1616
Sower and Trunk of an Old Yew Tree	28 October 1888	Van Gogh Museum, Amsterdam	Arles	JH 1619
Memory of the Garden at Etten	16 November 1888	Van Gogh Museum, Amsterdam	Arles	JH 1631
Woman Reading a Novel	16 November 1888	Van Gogh Museum, Amsterdam	Arles	JH 1633
Sower with Setting Sun	25 November 1888	Van Gogh Museum, Amsterdam	Arles	JH 1628
La Crau with Peach Trees in Bloom	10 April 1889	Private collection	Arles	JH 1682
Orchard in Bloom with View of Arles	10 April 1889	Private collection	Arles	JH 1684
Trees with Ivy	22 May 1889	Unknown	Saint Rémy	JH 1694
Great Peacock Moth	22 May 1889	Unknown	Saint Rémy	JH 1701
Cypresses	25 June 1889	Van Gogh Museum, Amsterdam	Saint Rémy	JH 1750
Enclosed Field with Ploughman	3–4 September 1889	Van Gogh Museum, Amsterdam	Saint Rémy	JH 1769
The Raising of Lazarus	3 May 1890	Van Gogh Museum, Amsterdam	Saint Rémy	JH 1973
Field of Grass with Dandelions and Tree Trunks	4 May 1890	Van Gogh Museum, Amsterdam	Saint Rémy	JH 1971
Doctor Gachet Sitting at a Table with Books and a Glass with Sprigs of Foxglove	3 June 1890	Van Gogh Museum, Amsterdam	Auvers-sur-Oise	JH 2008
L'Arlesienne (Madame Ginoux)	5 June 1890	Van Gogh Museum, Amsterdam	Auvers-sur-Oise	JH 1896
Road with Men Walking, Carriage, Cypress, Star, and Crescent Moon	17 June 1890	Van Gogh Museum, Amsterdam	Auvers-sur-Oise	JH 1983
Marguerite Gachet at the Piano	28 June 1890	Unknown	Auvers-sur-Oise	JH 2049
Girl with Straw Hat, Sitting in the Wheat	1 July 1890	Van Gogh Museum, Amsterdam	Auvers-sur-Oise	JH 2054
Wheat Fields	2 July 1890	Van Gogh Museum, Amsterdam	Auvers-sur-Oise	JH 2039
Couple Walking between Rows of Trees	2 July 1890	Van Gogh Museum, Amsterdam	Auvers-sur-Oise	JH 2042
Wheat Fields	23 July 1890	Van Gogh Museum, Amsterdam	Auvers-sur-Oise	JH 2100
Wheat Fields	23 July 1890	Van Gogh Museum, Amsterdam	Auvers-sur-Oise	JH 2103
Daubigny's Garden with Black Cat	23 July 1890	Van Gogh Museum, Amsterdam	Auvers-sur-Oise	JH 2106
Cottages with Thatched Roofs and Figures	23 July 1890	Van Gogh Museum, Amsterdam	Auvers-sur-Oise	JH 2116

== See also ==
- Almond Blossoms (Van Gogh series): Four paintings of blossoming almond trees or branches made in Arles or Saint-Remy
- Agostina Segatori Sitting in the Café du Tambourin: Parisian influences, Japanese wood block prints
- Asnières (Van Gogh series): Paris 1887, a group of paintings made in Asnières, a northwest suburb of Paris including parks, restaurants, the river Seine and factories. This work represents the significant transformation that Van Gogh's artwork took starting the spring of 1887
- Butterflies (Van Gogh series): Five paintings of butterflies made in Arles and Saint-Remy
- Copies by Vincent van Gogh: Paintings made in Saint-Remy of works by Millet, Delacroix, Rembrandt and others
- Early works of Vincent van Gogh – Etten, The Hague: Van Gogh's works from 1881 and 1882
- Flowering Orchards (Van Gogh series): Arles, expanded and provided references for an article about flowering trees and orchards made in 1888
- Hospital in Arles (Van Gogh series): paintings of the hospital garden and a sick ward
- Langlois Bridge at Arles (Van Gogh series): Arles, combination of new influences and those of Holland
- Le Moulin de la Galette (Van Gogh series): Montmartre, windmill paintings named Le Moulin de la Galette
- Montmarte (Van Gogh series): Paris, Montmartre area where Van Gogh lived with his brother, Theo
- Old Church Tower at Nuenen ('The Peasants' Churchyard'): Nuenen
- Olive Trees (Van Gogh series) of 16 paintings: Saint-Remy, spiritual significance, complement to The Starry Night
- Outskirts of Paris (Van Gogh): Paris
- Paintings of Children (Van Gogh series) of 30 paintings: changes over 10 years work, interest in portraits, desire to comfort
- Peasant Character Studies (Van Gogh series)
- The Roulin Family (Van Gogh series): Arles, interaction and support by Roulin family
- Saint-Paul Asylum, Saint-Rémy (Van Gogh series) is a collection of paintings that Van Gogh made of the asylum grounds or from his window in the asylum. It includes paintings of the interior, the enclosed wheat field he painted from his cell and a number of paintings of the garden grounds, trees and flowers. There are also three portraits.
- Seine (Van Gogh series): Paris, paintings along the Seine in Paris, Clichy, and Asnières. Section showing samples of Holland work and background information about Haussmann renovations throughout the article.
- Still life paintings by Vincent van Gogh (Netherlands)
- Still life paintings by Vincent van Gogh (Paris)
- Still Life: Vase with Pink Roses: Paris, color theory, color fading (especially the pink/reds)
- Trees and Undergrowth (Van Gogh series)
- Van Gogh's family in his art
- Vase with Red Poppies: Paris, one of Van Gogh's many still lifes of flowers painted in Paris
- The Wheat Field: paintings of the enclosed wheat field visible from Van Gogh's room at Saint-Paul asylum
- Wheat Fields (Van Gogh series) of 48 paintings, not all of which have public domain images: changes over 10 years, spiritual significance, color, insight into his time at Saint-Paul, peasant genre, desire to comfort, blazing sun, desire to work as hard as the laborers.

== Sources ==
- The Vincent van Gogh Gallery. The Paintings: A–Z Listings. Retrieved 11 August 2006.
- Van Gogh Virtual Museum. Painting list. Retrieved 11 August 2006.
