= 1883 in art =

Events from the year 1883 in the arts

== Events ==
- April – Exhibition of Impressionist paintings opens at the Dowdeswell Gallery in London.
- 20 April – Claude Monet moves to the house in Giverny which will be his main residence for the rest of his life.
- 28 October – Les XX established in Brussels by Octave Maus.
- J.-K. Huysmans publishes L'Art moderne.

== Works ==
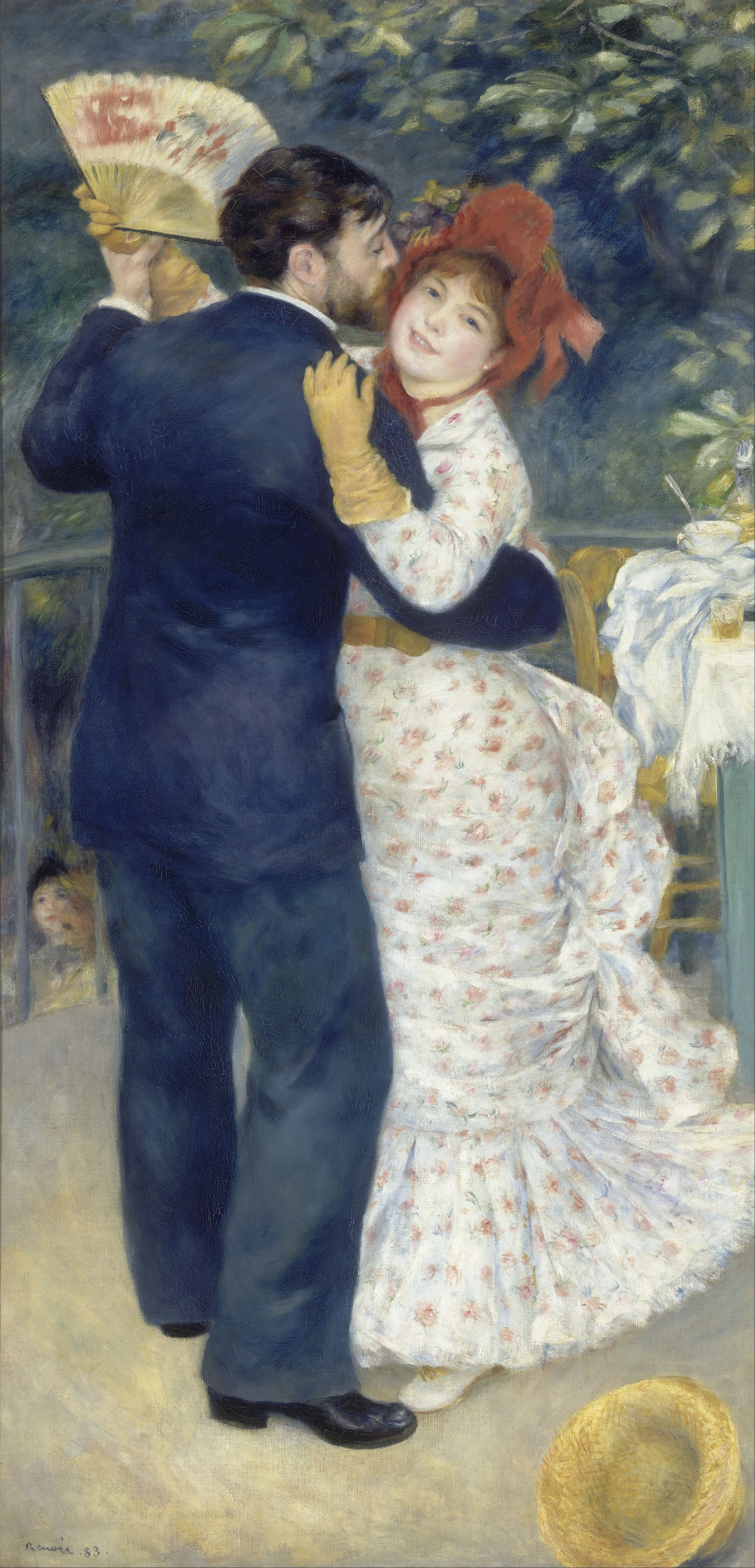
Pierre-Auguste Renoir, Dance in the Country, 1883, Musée d'Orsay, Paris, France

- Michael Ancher – Redningsbåden køres gennem klitterne ("The Lifeboat is Taken through the Dunes")
- Marie Bashkirtseff
  - Autumn
  - The Umbrella
- Arnold Böcklin – Isle of the Dead (Die Toteninsel, 3rd version)
- Gustave Caillebotte – Portrait of Henri Cordier
- William Merritt Chase
  - Mrs Meigs at the Piano Organ
  - Portrait of Miss Dora Wheeler
- John Collier
  - Marion Collier
  - The Pharaoh's Handmaidens
- Pierre Auguste Cot – The Storm
- Pascal Dagnan-Bouveret – Hamlet and the Gravediggers
- Pierre Puvis de Chavannes
  - The Dream
  - Ludus Pro Patria
- Luke Fildes – The Village Wedding
- William Powell Frith – A Private View at the Royal Academy, 1881
- Jean-Léon Gérôme – The Christian Martyrs' Last Prayer
- James Guthrie
  - A Hind's Daughter
  - To Pastures New
- Sydney Prior Hall – The three daughters of King Edward VII and Queen Alexandra
- Frank Holl – Portrait of William Agnew
- Ivan Kramskoi – Portrait of an Unknown Woman
- John Lavery – The Bridge at Grez
- Benjamin Williams Leader – The Valley of the Llugwy
- Charles-Auguste Lebourg – Labour (sculpture)
- William Logsdail – The Piazza of Saint Mark's, Venice
- Edwin Long – Anno Domini
- Konstantin Makovsky – A Boyar Wedding Feast
- Jacek Malczewski – The Prisoners
- John Everett Millais – Portrait of the Marquess of Salisbury
- Claude Monet – Stormy Sea in Étretat
- William Morris – Strawberry Thief textile design
- Walter Osborne – Apple Gathering, Quimperlé
- Paul Philippoteaux – Gettysburg Cyclorama
- Edward Poynter – The Ides of March
- Pierre-Auguste Renoir:
  - By the Seashore
  - Dance at Bougival
  - Dance in the Country
- Georges Rochegrosse - Vitellius Dragged Through the Streets of Rome by the Popoulus
- Ilya Repin – Religious Procession in Kursk Province
- William Wetmore Story – Chief Justice John Marshall (bronze)
- James Tissot
  - The Bridesmaid
  - A Little Nimrod
- Henri de Toulouse-Lautrec – Self-portrait in a mirror
- Jan van Beers – Portrait of a Young Woman
- Henry Van Brunt and Frank M. Howe – William Washington Gordon Monument
- Vincent van Gogh
  - Cottages (continuing series)
  - Peasant Character Studies (continuing series)
  - Bulb Fields
  - Cows in the Meadow (lost)
  - Drawbridge in Nieuw-Amsterdam (watercolor)
  - Farm with Stacks of Peat
  - Farmhouse Among Trees
  - Farmhouses in Loosduinen near The Hague at Twilight
  - Footbridge across a Ditch
  - Landscape with a Church at Twilight
  - Landscape with Dunes
  - Landscape with Trees (watercolor)
  - Landscape with Wheelbarrow (watercolor)
  - Marshy Landscape
  - Meadows near Rijswijk and the Schenkweg
  - Peatery in Drenthe
  - Three Figures near a Canal with Windmill
  - A Wind-Beaten Tree
- Fritz von Uhde – Summer Resort
- Erik Werenskiold
  - September
  - Shepherds at Tåtøy
- W. L. Wyllie – Toil, Glitter, Grime and Wealth on a Flowing Tide

== Births ==
- 3 February – Camille Bombois, French naïve painter (died 1970).
- 18 February – Jacques Ochs, French artist, épée and foil fencer and Olympic gold medallist (died 1971).
- 12 April
  - Francis Cadell, Scottish Colourist painter (died 1937)
  - Imogen Cunningham, American photographer (died 1976).
- 24 June – Jean Metzinger, French painter and art theorist (died 1956).
- 16 July – Charles Sheeler, American modernist painter and photographer (died 1965).
- 31 July – Erich Heckel, German painter and printmaker (died 1970).
- 19 August – Coco Chanel, French fashion designer (died 1972).
- 20 August – Caroline Risque, American sculptor and painter (died 1952).
- 14 September – Richard Gerstl, Austrian painter and draughtsman (died 1908).
- 9 November – Charles Demuth, American painter (died 1935).
- 4 December – Felice Casorati, Italian painter (died 1963).
- 24 December – Stojan Aralica, famous Serbian Impressionist painter and academic (died 1980).
- 26 December – Maurice Utrillo, French painter (died 1955).
- date unknown – Charles Jourdan, French fashion designer (died 1976).

== Deaths ==
- January 12 – Clark Mills, American sculptor (born 1810)
- January 19 – Guillaume Geefs, Belgian sculptor (born 1805)
- January 23 – Gustave Doré, French illustrator (born 1832)
- February 26 – Miguel Ângelo Lupi, Portuguese painter (born 1826)
- April 30 – Édouard Manet, French painter (born 1832; died following amputation)
- July 14 – Edward Calvert, English painter and printmaker (born 1799)
- August 19 – József Borsos, Hungarian portrait painter and photographer (born 1821)
- November 24 – Albert Fitch Bellows, American landscape painter (born 1829)
- December 11 – Richard Doyle, British illustrator (born 1824)
