= Red Cabbages and Garlic =

Oil painting painted by Vincent Van Gogh

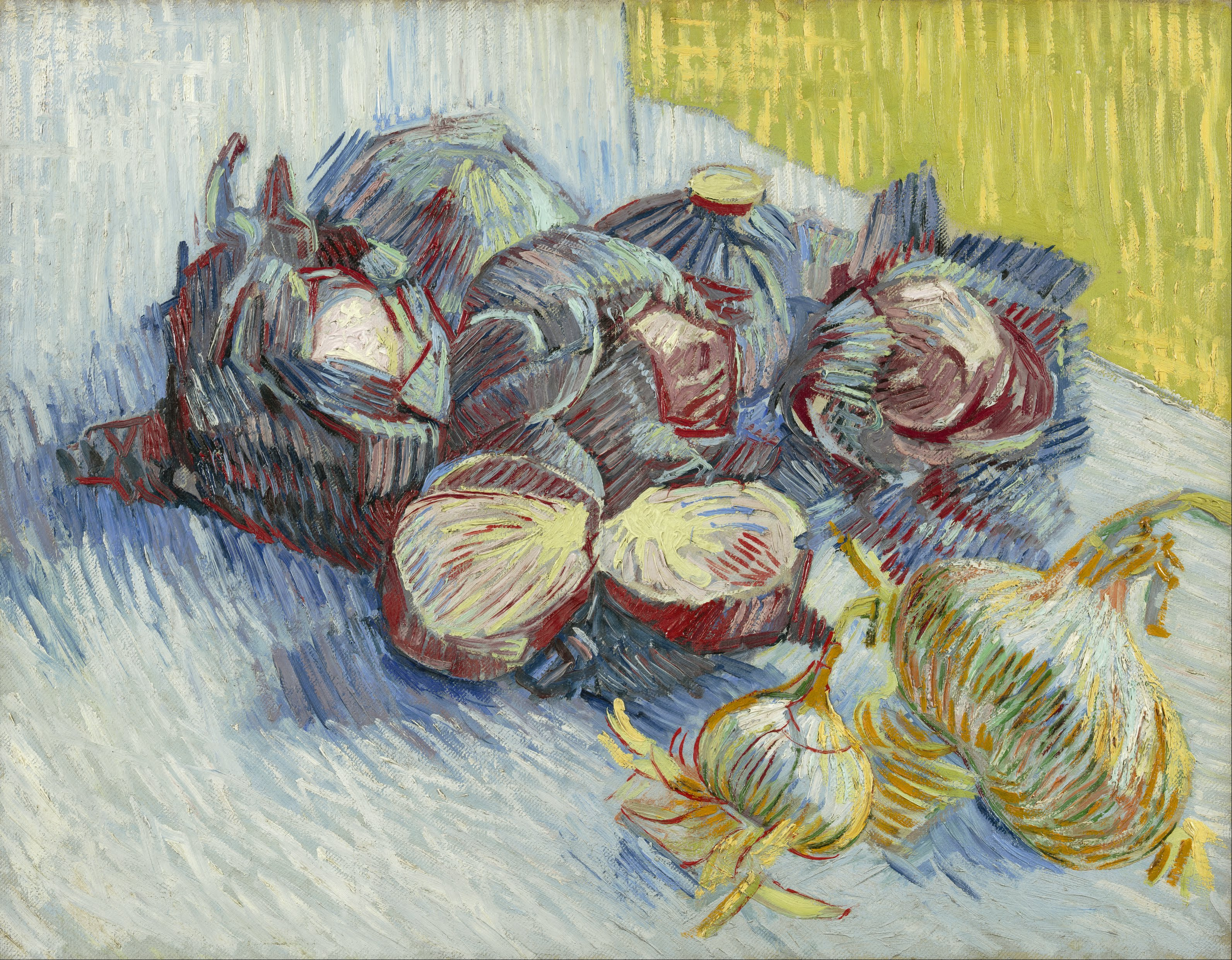
- Artist: Vincent van Gogh
- Year: 1887
- Catalogue: F374; JH1338
- Medium: oil on canvas
- Movement: Post Impressionism
- Dimensions: 50 cm × 64.5 cm (20 in × 25.4 in)
- Location: Van Gogh Museum

Red Cabbages and Garlic (F374) is an oil painting on canvas by Post-Impressionist artist Vincent van Gogh in Paris in 1887.

The painting was formerly known as Red Cabbages and Onion until 2023, when the name was changed upon observation of the bulbs by a chef. It is currently held at the Van Gogh Museum.

== Description ==
Painted on twill canvas, the painting is part of a series of still life paintings made when he lived in Montmartre, Paris, and decorated the apartment of his brother Theo van Gogh.

The painting utilizes mini-brushstrokes, of blues, greens, and a rusty red for the red cabbage, and yellows and oranges for the garlic, on a white cloth, though the shades used for the tablecloth aged with time, turning from purple into a greyish-blue.

After Theo's death, the painting was passed thence with descent, by his widow Jo van Gogh-Bonger, then to son Vincent Willem van Gogh. It went on public debut in 1928 by Paul Cassirer's gallery in Berlin. It was then loaned to the Stedelijk Museum in 1931, then transferred to the Vincent van Gogh Foundation run by the Netherlands. It was on loan to the Rijksmuseum from 1973, and has been since then been displayed at the Van Gogh Museum July 1, 1994 onwards.

== Renaming ==
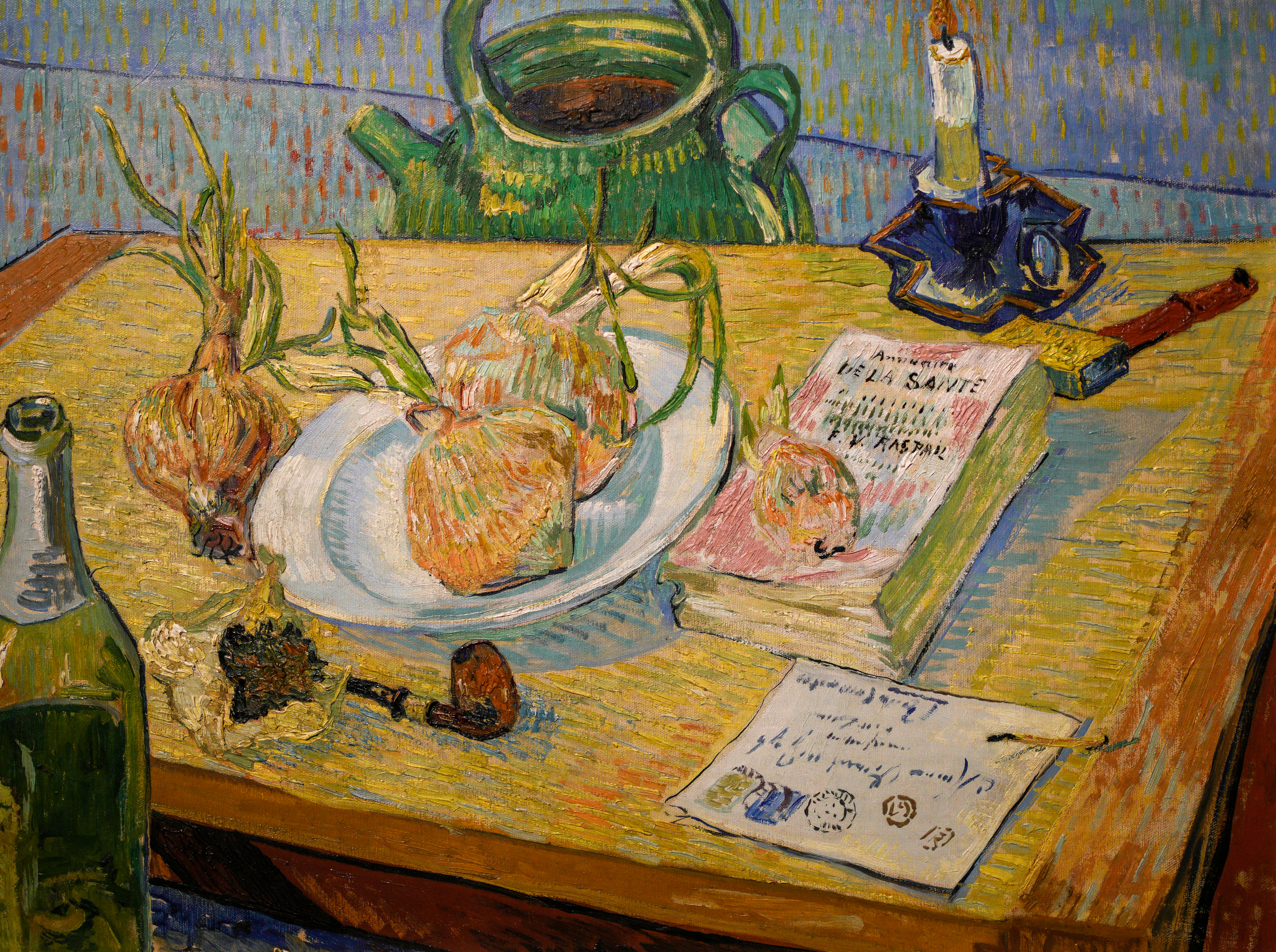
Still Life: Drawing Board, Pipe, Onions and Sealing Wax

In 2022, Ernst de Witte, head chef of "Restaurant Feu" in Utrecht, visited the museum, and noted that the "onions" in the painting was in fact garlic. In an interview with Hyperallergic, the chef and his wife presented n analysis of the painting on Microsoft PowerPoint comparing the painting with another painting Still Life: Drawing Board, Pipe, Onions and Sealing Wax F604 (1889), housed at the Kröller-Müller Museum, differentiating how Van Gogh utilized shape and colors of garlic and onion. It was determined that the painting's title was misnamed since 1928, and was then amended. As a tribute to this encounter, de Witte made a "Red Cabbage and Garlic" dish at his restaurant: poached red cabbage on a puffed garlic creme, and drizzled with a lemon balm and tarragon vinaigrette, with absinthe, Van Gogh's favorite alcoholic drink.

== See also ==
- List of works by Vincent van Gogh
