= Two Rats =

Painting by Vincent van Gogh

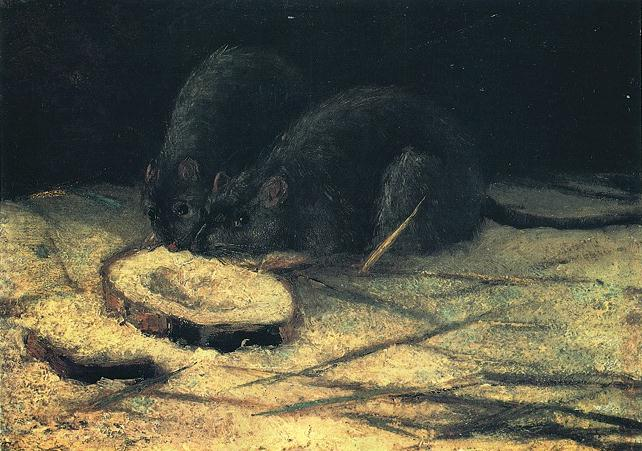
- Artist: Vincent van Gogh
- Year: 1884
- Catalogue: F177; JH543
- Medium: Oil on wood
- Dimensions: 29.5 cm × 41.5 cm (11.6 in × 16.3 in)
- Location: Private collection

Two Rats is an oil painting created in 1884 by Vincent van Gogh.

== See also ==
- List of works by Vincent van Gogh
