= The Large Plane Trees =

1889 painting by Vincent van Gogh

- Artist: Vincent van Gogh
- Year: 1889
- Catalogue: F657; JH1860
- Medium: Oil on canvas
- Dimensions: 73.4 cm × 91.8 cm (28.9 in × 36.1 in)
- Location: Cleveland Museum of Art, Cleveland

The Large Plane Trees, also called Road Menders at Saint-Rémy is an oil painting by Vincent van Gogh. Painted in 1889 in Saint-Rémy, France, the painting depicts roadwork underneath autumn trees with yellow leaves. In actuality, "The Large Plane Trees" and the "Road Menders" are two different paintings and are sometimes confused as one. Van Gogh painted "The Large Plane Trees" first on a red and white checkered table cloth. He later returned and painted it again on an art canvas.

It is in the collection of the Cleveland Museum of Art.

== Description ==
The Large Plane Trees is an oil painting on a 73.4 by 91.8 cm canvas. Van Gogh depicted road work in Saint-Rémy, and the autumn yellow leaves of plane trees.

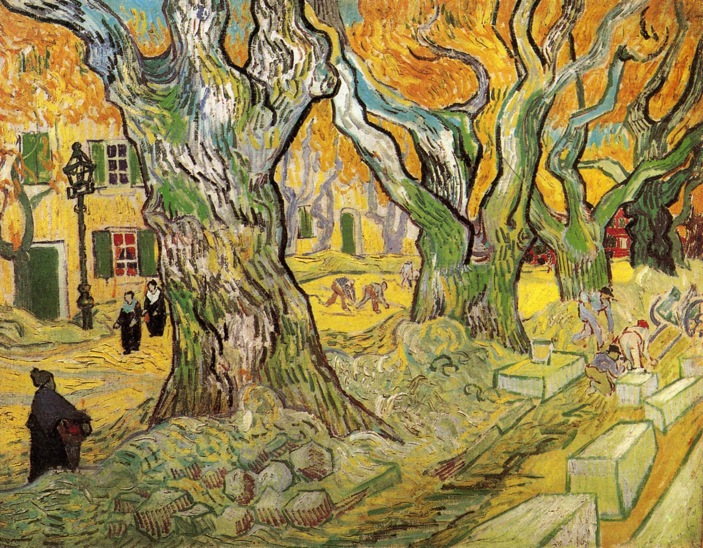
The Road Menders, Van Gogh's repetition of The Large Plane Trees.

This scene was repeated in The Road Menders, part of the Philips Collection in Washington D.C. In 2013, the two paintings were displayed together as part of the Van Gogh Repetitions exhibition at the Phillips Collection before The Large Plane Trees was moved to the Cleveland Museum of Art. Analysis shows that The Large Plane Trees was created first, with The Road Menders being a copy with virtually identical outlines.

== See also ==
- List of works by Vincent van Gogh
