= Avenue of Poplars at Sunset =

Painting by Vincent van Gogh

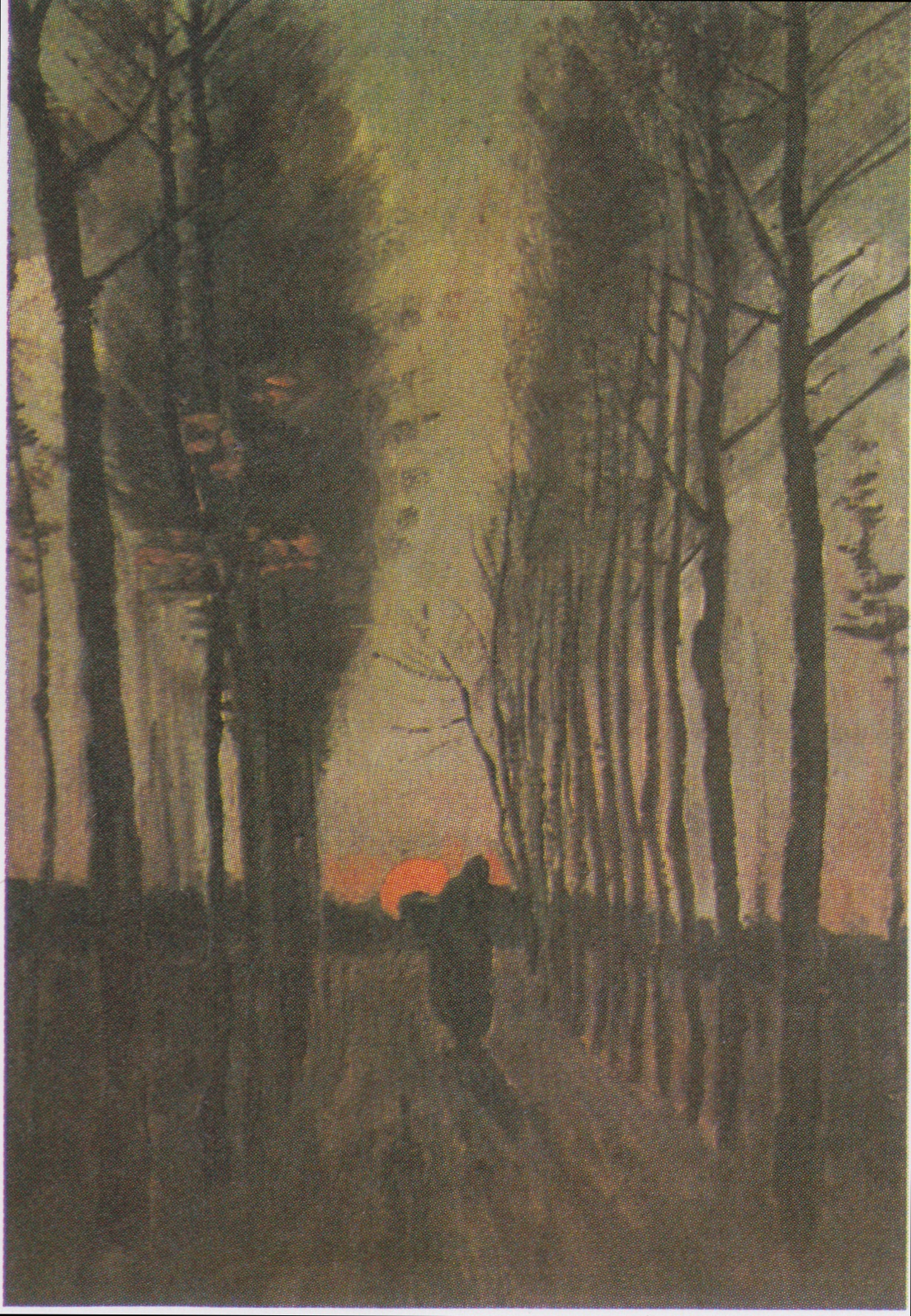
- Artist: Vincent van Gogh
- Year: 1884
- Catalogue: F123; JH518
- Medium: Oil on canvas
- Dimensions: 45.8 cm × 32.2 cm (18.0 in × 12.7 in)
- Location: Kröller-Müller Museum; Otterlo

Avenue of Poplars at Sunset is an oil painting created on 13 or 14 November 1884 by Vincent van Gogh in Nuenen in The Netherlands. A woman in the distance is walking towards the sunset on a gravel road with poplars, their autumn leaves shed. The painting is held at the Kröller-Müller Museum in The Netherlands.

== See also ==
- List of works by Vincent van Gogh
