= Landscape with Pollard Willows =

Painting by Vincent van Gogh

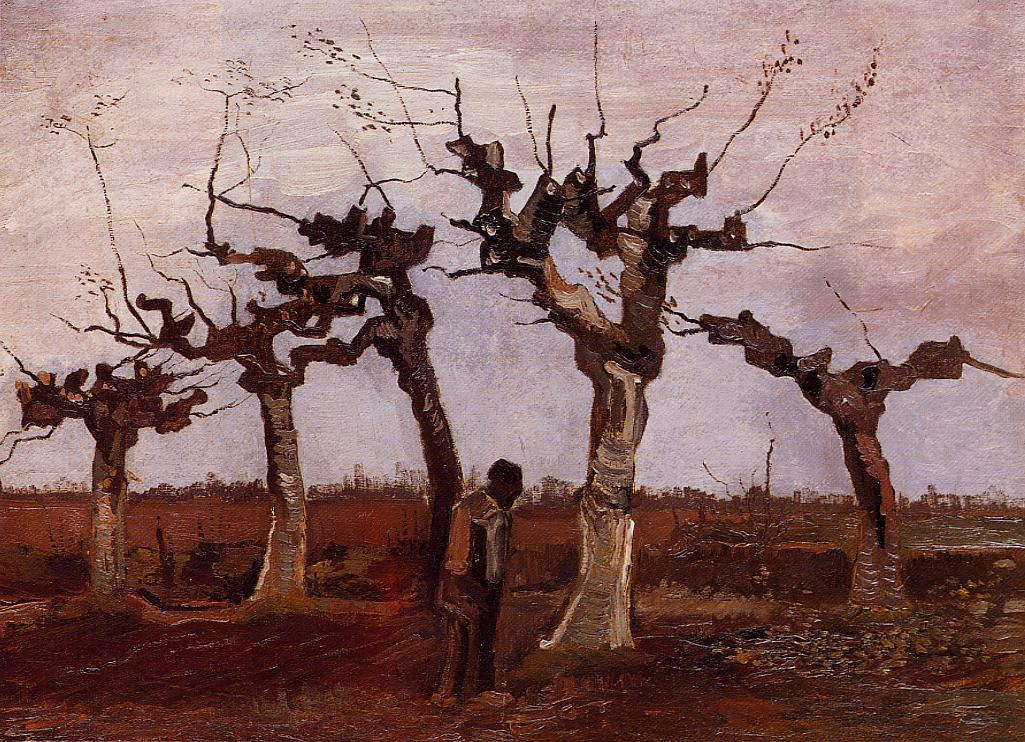
- Artist: Vincent van Gogh
- Year: 1882
- Catalogue: F31; JH477
- Medium: Oil on canvas
- Dimensions: 43.0 cm × 58.0 cm (16.9 in × 22.8 in)
- Location: Private collection

Landscape with Pollard Willows is an oil painting created in April 1884 by Vincent van Gogh.

== See also ==
- List of works by Vincent van Gogh
