= Lane in Autumn =

Painting by Vincent van Gogh

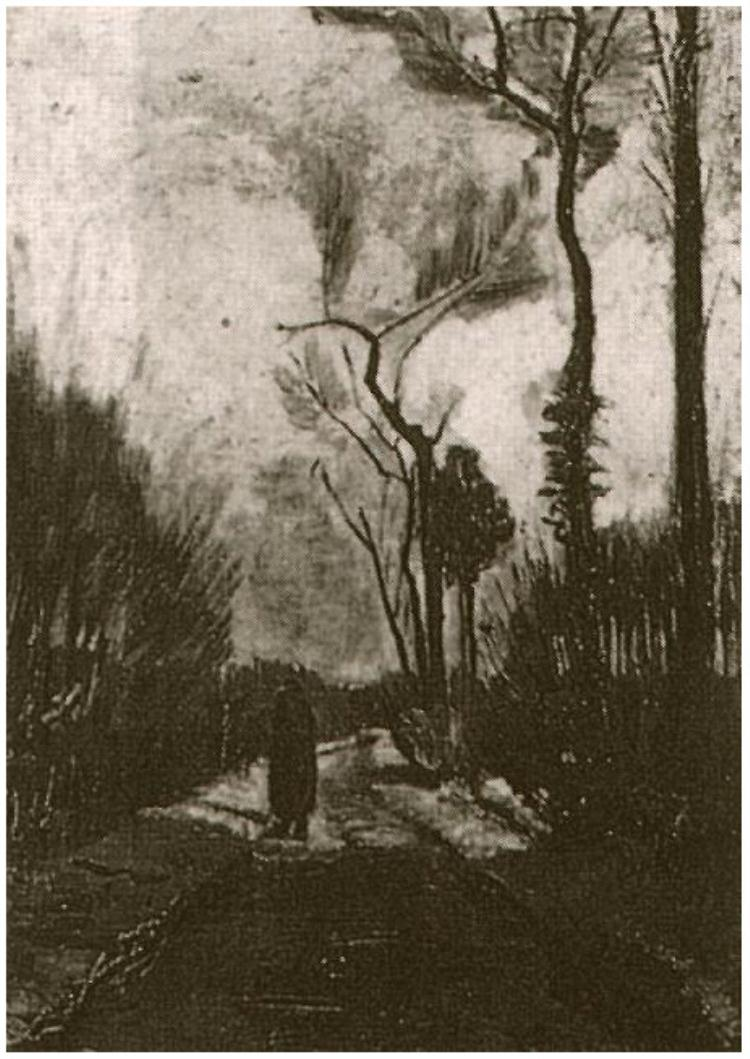
- Artist: Vincent van Gogh
- Year: 1884–85
- Catalogue: F120; JH519
- Medium: Oil on canvas on panel
- Dimensions: 46.0 cm × 35.0 cm (18.1 in × 13.8 in)
- Location: Private collection

Lane in Autumn or Country Lane is an oil painting created in 1884–85 by Vincent van Gogh.

== See also ==
- List of works by Vincent van Gogh
