= Village at Sunset =

Painting by Vincent van Gogh

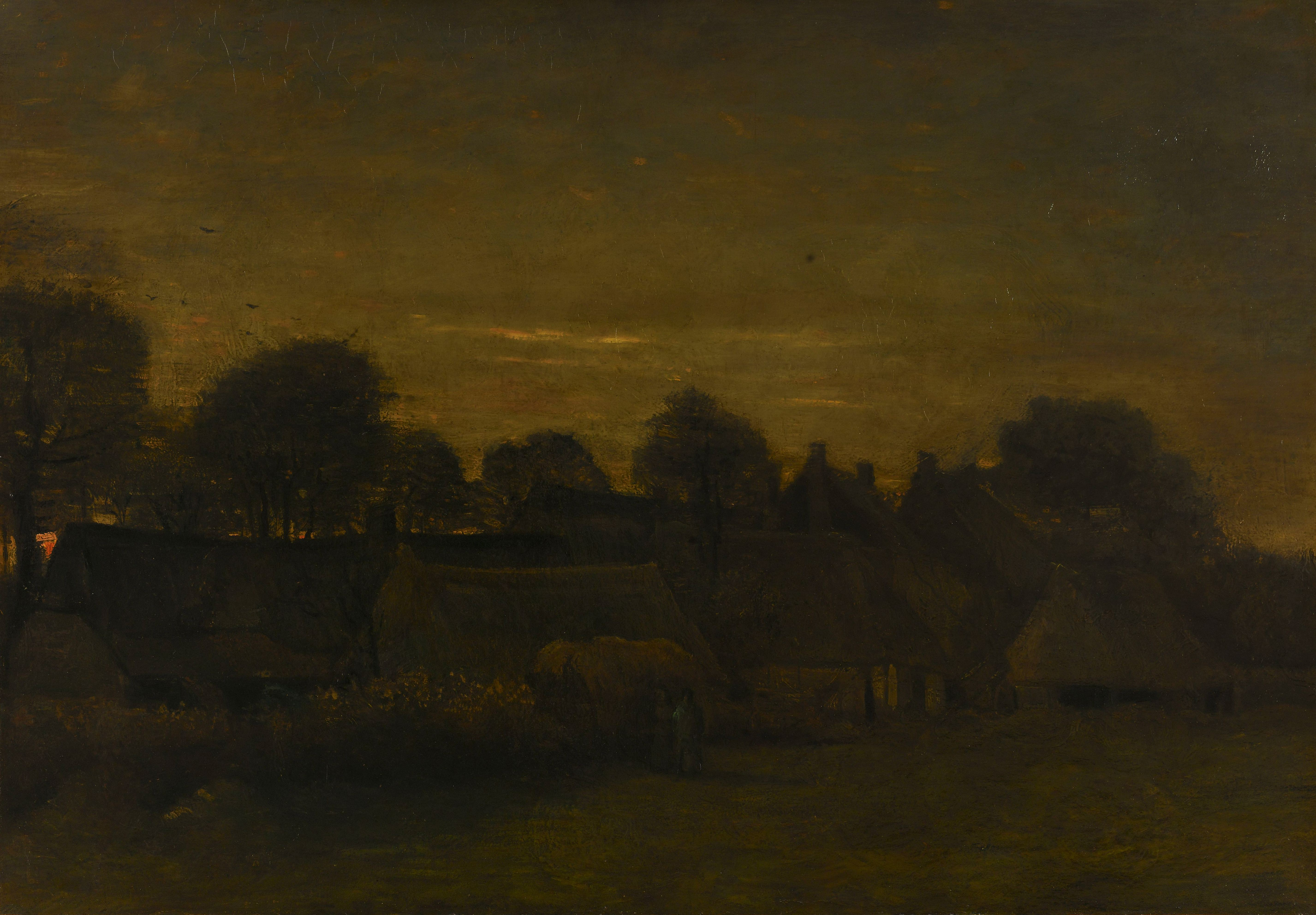
- Artist: Vincent van Gogh
- Year: 1884
- Catalogue: F190; JH492
- Medium: oil on canvas
- Dimensions: 57 cm × 82 cm (22 in × 32 in)
- Location: Rijksmuseum; Amsterdam

Village at Sunset is an oil painting created in 1884 by Vincent van Gogh. It is currently on display at Rijksmuseum in Amsterdam.

== See also ==
- List of works by Vincent van Gogh
