= Stormy Sea =

Stormy Sea may refer to:

- Stormy Seas, a 1923 American film
- Stormy Seas (1932 film), a Flip the Frog cartoon
- Stormy Sea (song), a 1991 song by Susumu Hirasawa off the album Virtual Rabbit
- A Stormy Sea (song), a 1998 song from the movie soundtrack album Pokémon: The First Movie (soundtrack)
- Stormy Sea (Emil Nolde), a 1930 landscape painting by Emil Nolde
- Stormy Sea in Étretat, a 1883 painting by Claude Monet
- Stormy Sea at Night, a 1849 painting by Ivan Aivazovsky; see 1849 in art
- Stormy Sea, a series of 1600s paintings by Jacob van Ruisdael; see List of paintings by Jacob van Ruisdael

== See also ==
- Incantation for a Stormy Sea (song), an a cappella composition
- The Storm at Sea, a 1559 oil painting by Pieter Bruegel the Elder
- Storm Aviation Sea Storm, a home-built flying boat kitplane
- Sea of Storms (disambiguation)
- Stormy (disambiguation)
- Sea (disambiguation)
