= Shoes (Vincent van Gogh) =

1886 painting by Vincent van Gogh

- Shoenen (Dutch)
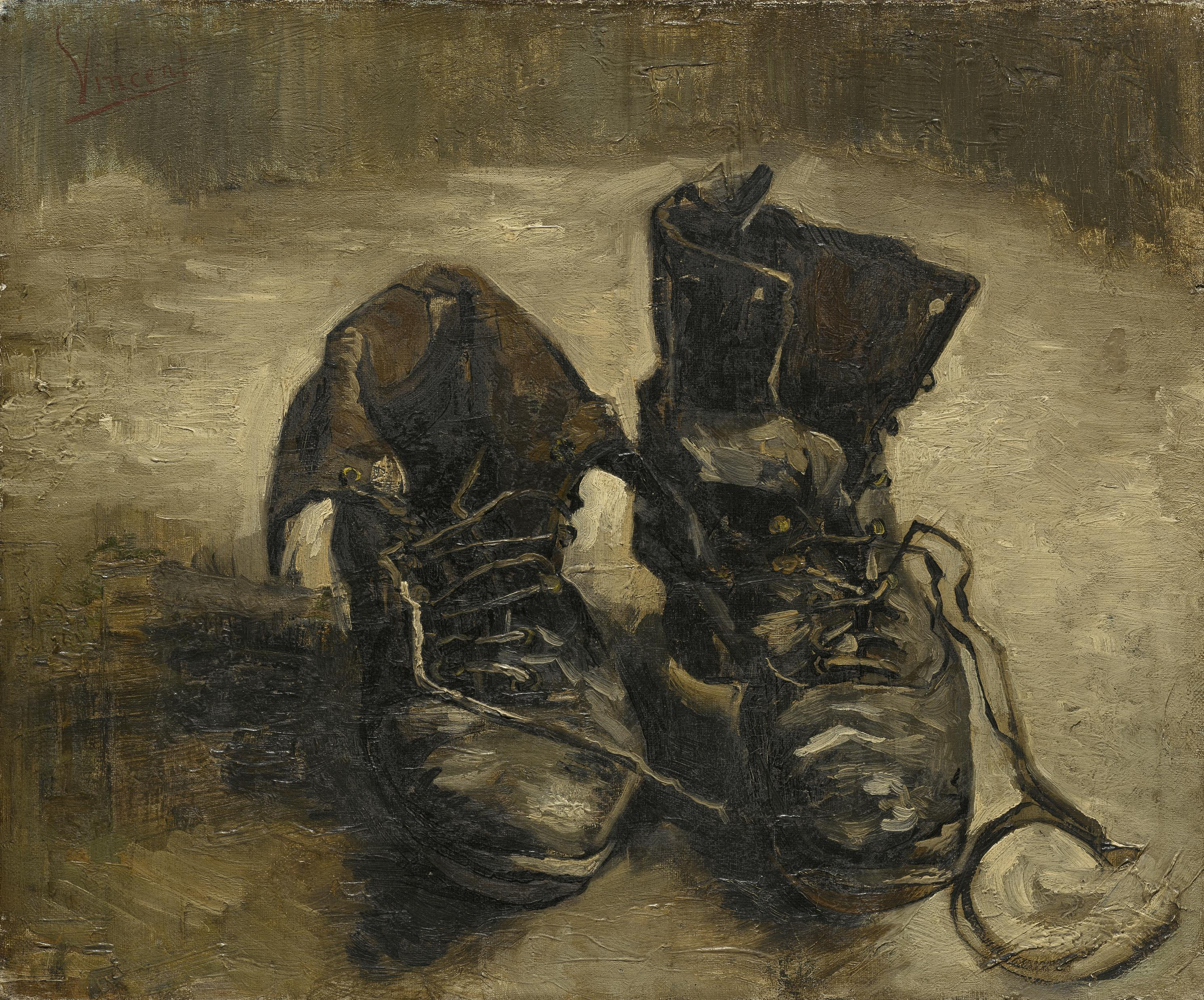
- Artist: Vincent van Gogh
- Year: 1886
- Catalogue: F255; JH1124
- Medium: oil on canvas
- Movement: Post-Impressionism
- Dimensions: 37.5 cm × 45 cm (14.8 in × 18 in)
- Location: Van Gogh Museum, Amsterdam
- Accession: s0011V1962

Shoes (Schoenen) is a painting completed by the Dutch Post-Impressionist artist Vincent van Gogh between September and November 1886 in Paris. The work is in the collection of the Van Gogh Museum in Amsterdam. In addition to the 1886 painting, van Gogh painted other versions of the same subject between 1886 and 1887.

== History ==
The work originated after van Gogh had visited a flea market in Paris in 1886 and had come across a pair of worn-out shoes. He subsequently purchased them and later brought them to his studio in Montmartre. According to some sources, the shoes did not fit well, prompting the artist to use them as a prop for a painting. Following van Gogh's death, the painting has become a subject of various art historical and philosophical analyses, including those by Martin Heidegger, Meyer Schapiro, Fredric Jameson and Jacques Derrida, among others. It has been described as "the most celebrated footwear in the history of modern art".

== Gallery ==
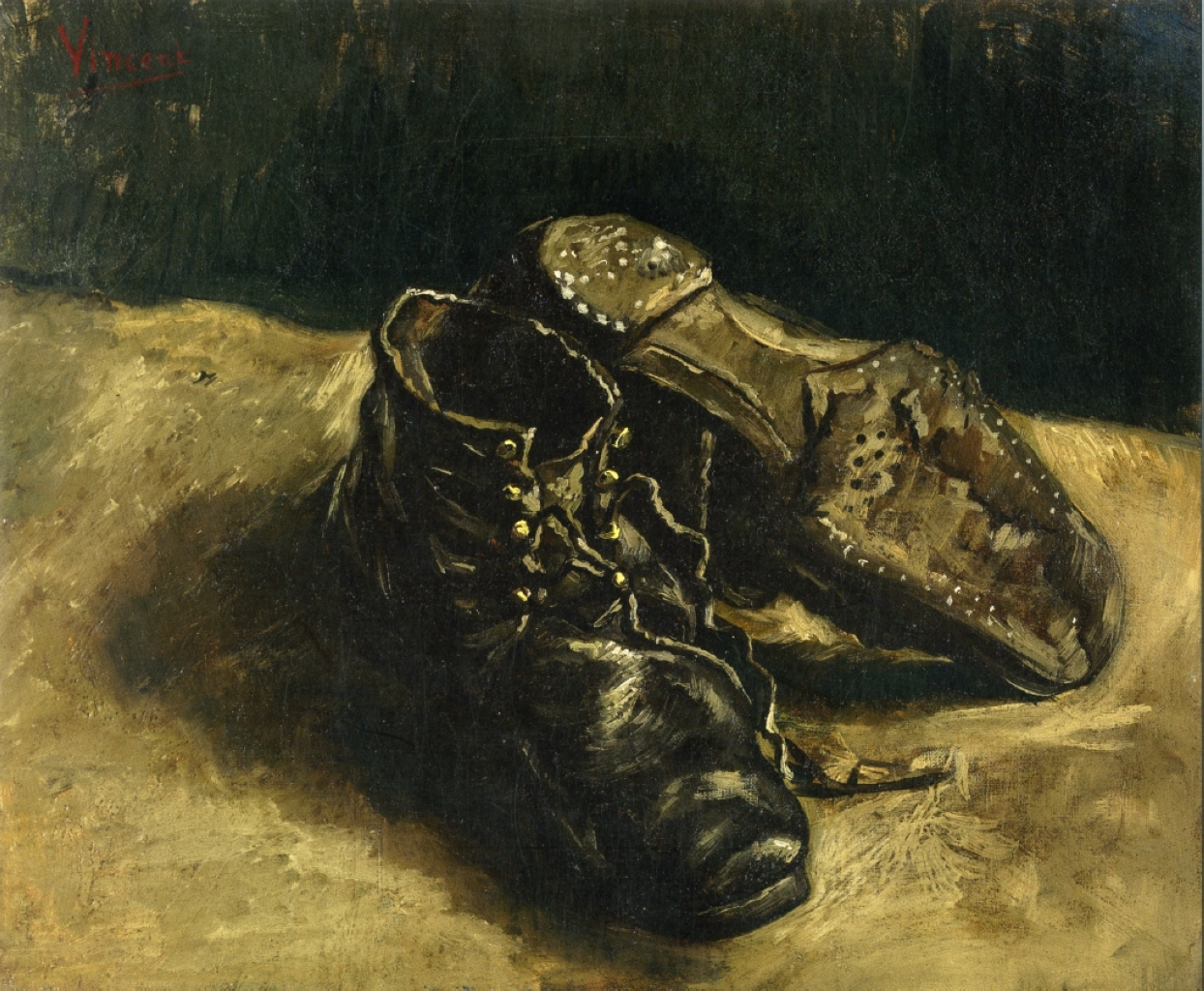
A Pair of Shoes, 1887, Private collection, 37.5 x 45.5cm, F332a/JH1233

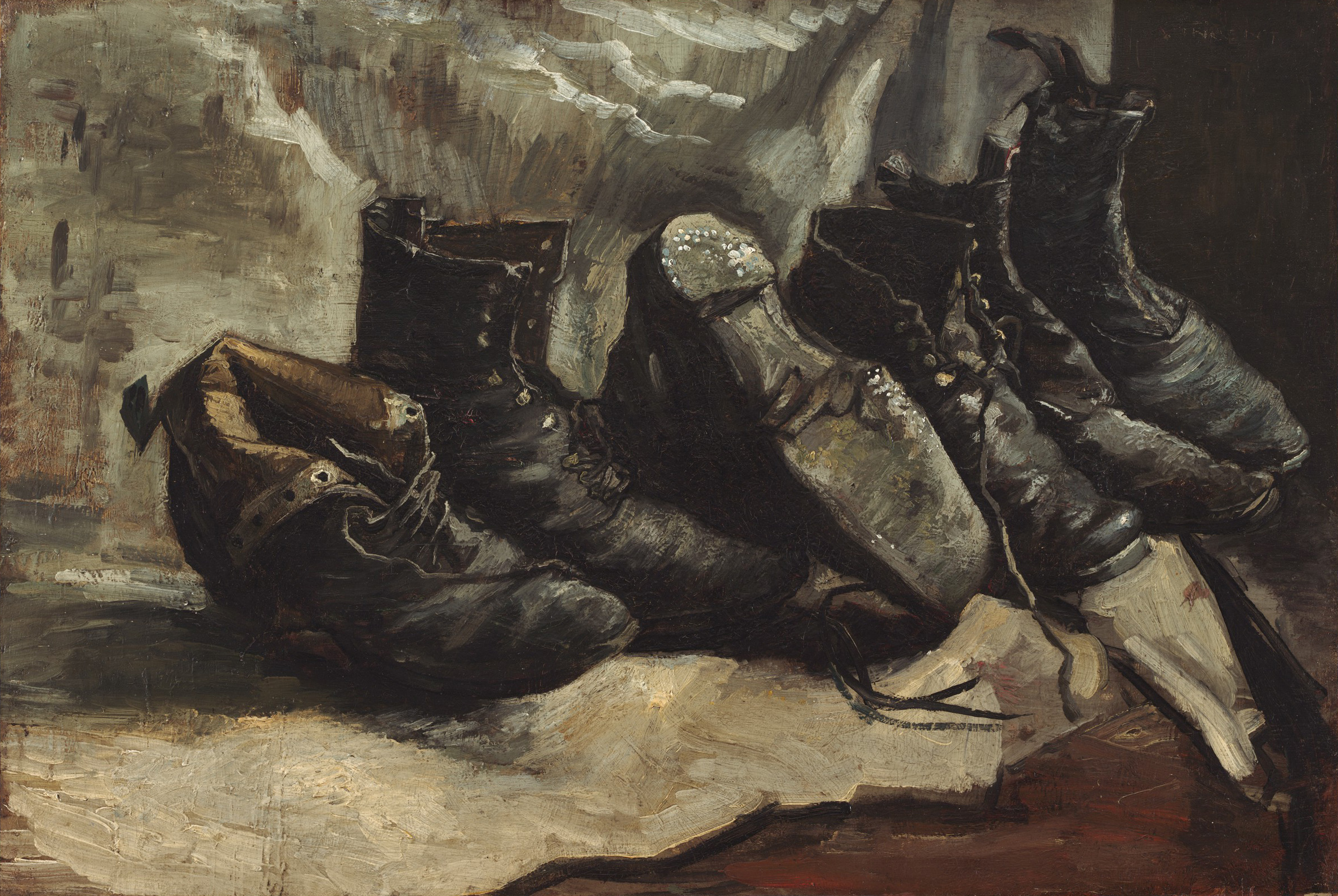
Three pairs of Shoes,1887, Fogg Museum, Cambridge, 49 x 72cm, F332/JH1234

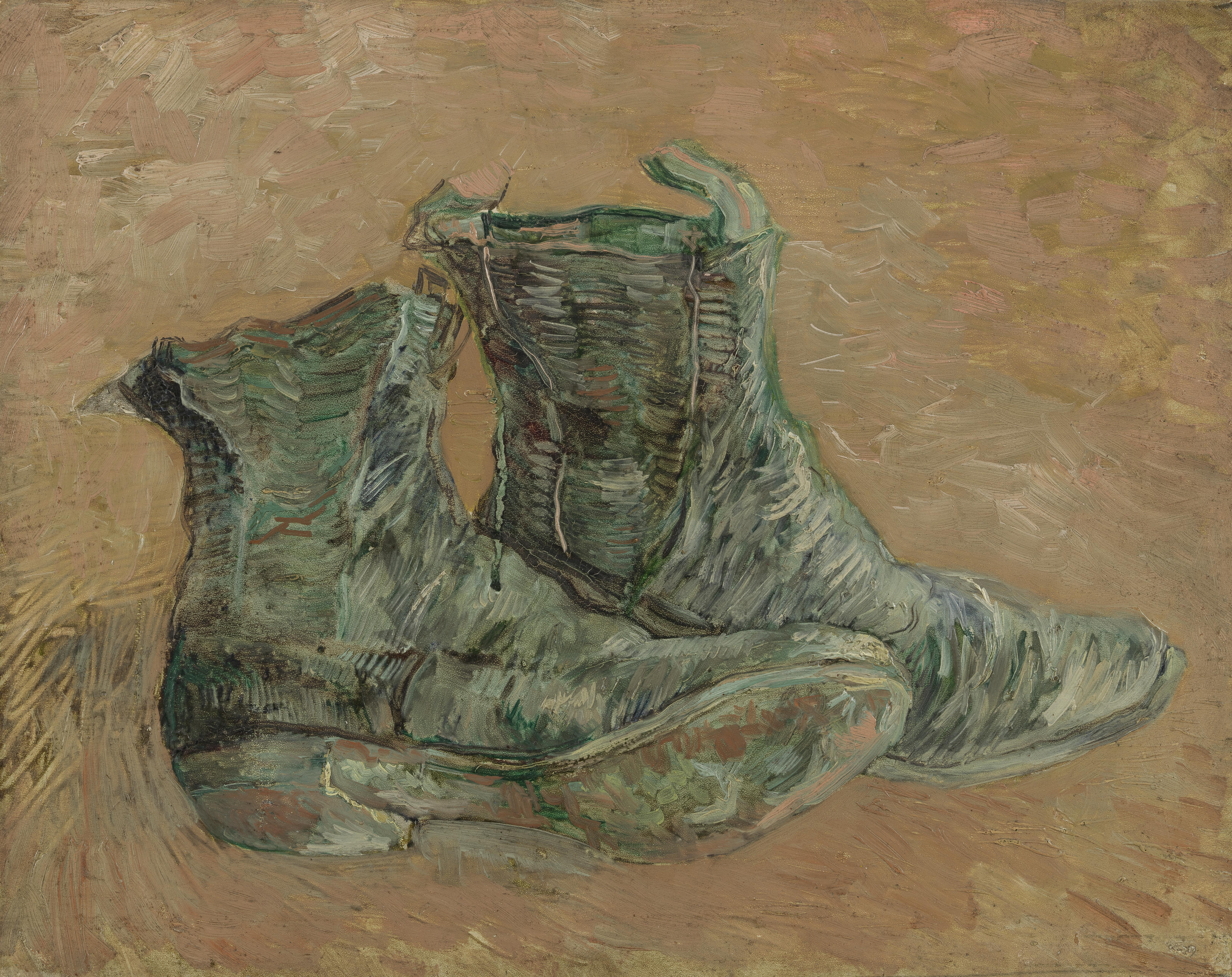
A Pair of Shoes, 1887, Van Gogh Museum, Amsterdam, Oil on paper on cardboard, 33 x 41cm, F331/JH1235

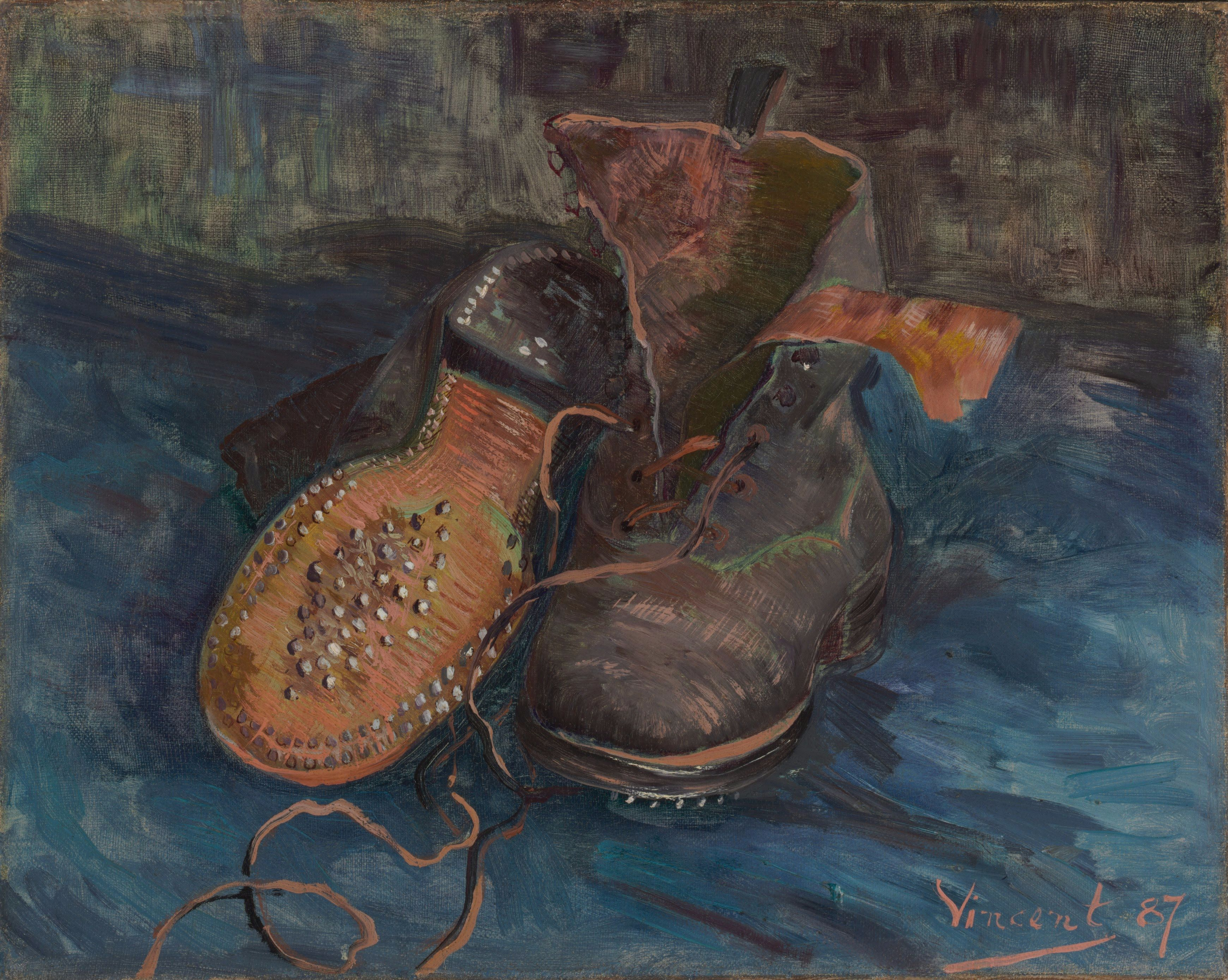
A Pair of Shoes, 1887년, Baltimore Museum of Art, 34 x 41.5 cm, F333/JH1236

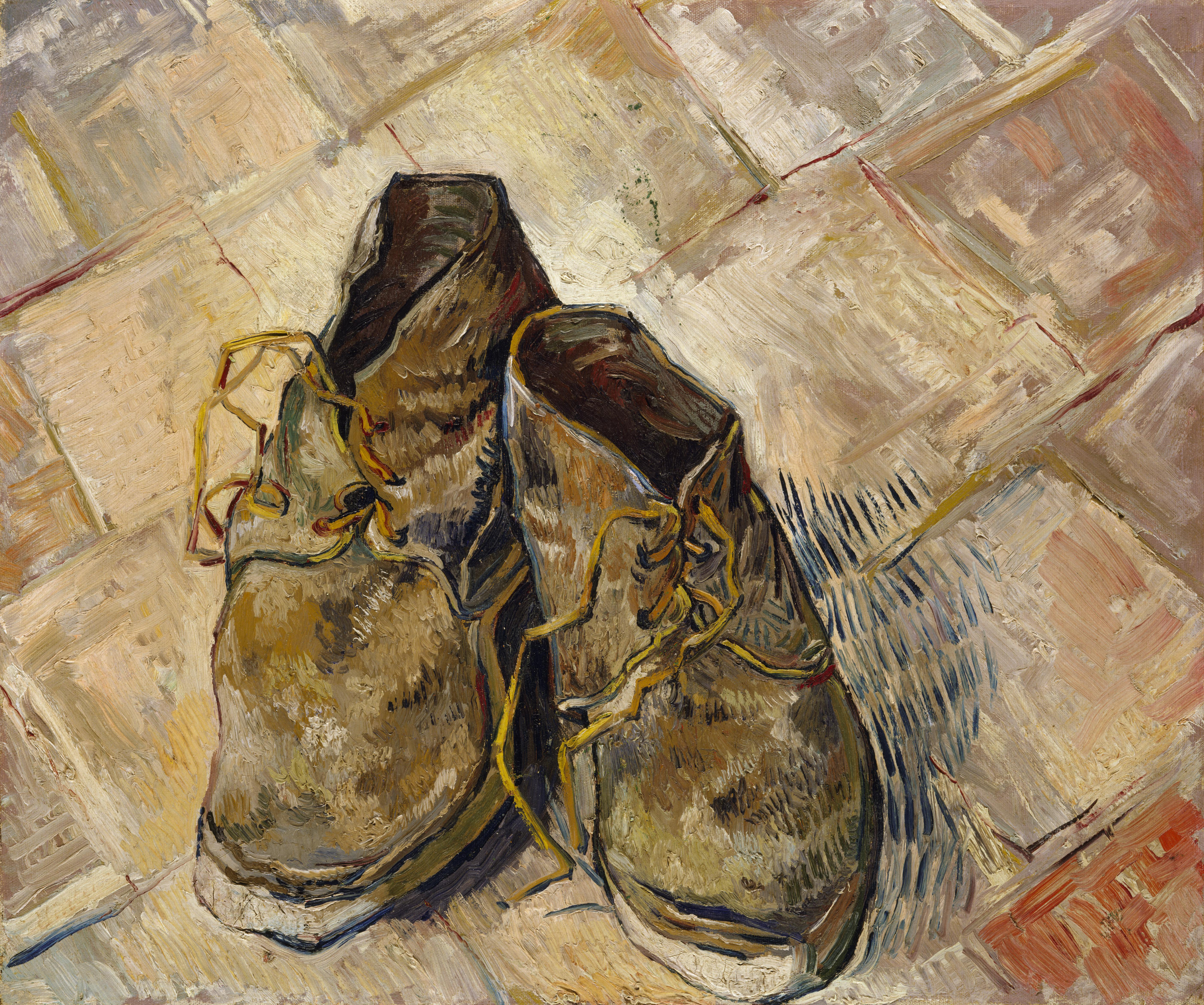
A Pair of Shoes, August 1888, Metropolitan Museum of Art, New York, 44 x 53cm, F461/JH1569

== See also ==
- List of works by Vincent van Gogh
