= Head of an Old Farmer's Wife in a White Hat =

1884 painting by Dutch painter Vincent Van Gogh

- Dutch: Kop van een oude boerin met een witte muts
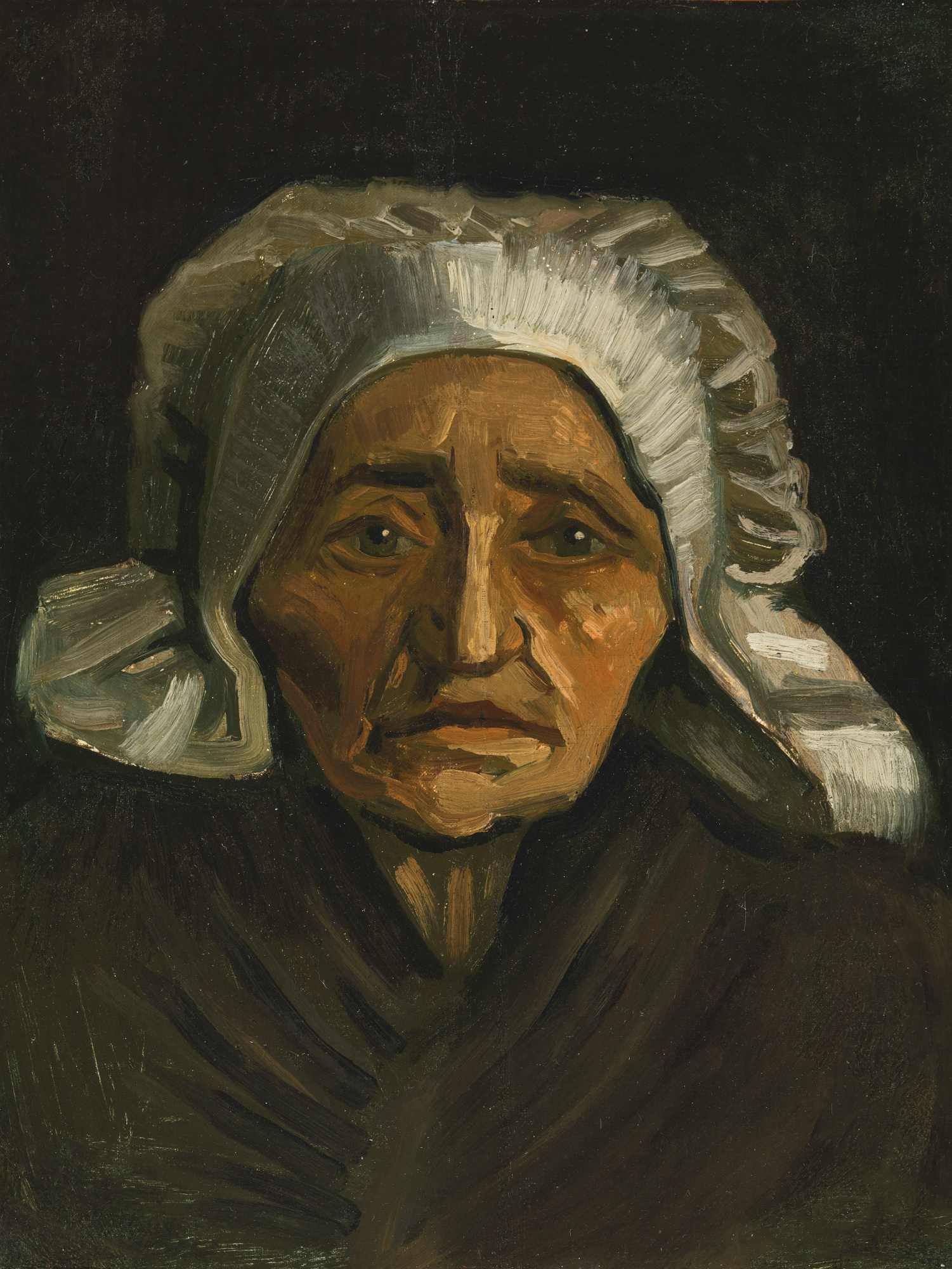
- Artist: Vincent van Gogh
- Year: circa 1884
- Catalogue: F140; JH551
- Medium: Oil on canvas cardboard
- Dimensions: 63 cm × 48 cm (25 in × 19 in)
- Owner: Private

Head of an Old Farmer's Wife in a White Hat (Dutch: Kop van een oude boerin met een witte muts) is an 1884 oil painting by Dutch painter Vincent van Gogh.

== Background ==
Head of an Old Farmer's Wife in a White Hat was painted by Vincent van Gogh around 1884 while he was living with his parents in the town of Nuenen, about a year before he finished The Potato Eaters. The painting is 63 × 48 centimeters.

According to the Kröller-Müller Museum, the painting depicts Gordina de Groot, a local farmer from Nuenen. She also appears in The Potato Eaters, and about 20 other of Van Gogh's paintings.

== Ownership history ==
The painting was previously displayed in the Kröller-Müller Museum before its March 2024 sale.

In March 2024, the painting was auctioned for an undisclosed sum over 4.5 million euros at The European Fine Art Fair in the Netherlands. The painting's seller, president of the M.S. Rau Gallery Bill Rau, said the painting was sold to a private museum "outside the European Union" and "it will be accessible to the public."

== See also ==
- List of works by Vincent van Gogh
