= Plain near Auvers =

Painting by Vincent van Gogh

- Ebene bei Auvers (German)
- Artist: Vincent van Gogh
- Year: 1890
- Catalogue: F782; JH2099
- Medium: oil on canvas
- Dimensions: 73.5 cm × 92.0 cm (28.9 in × 36.2 in)
- Location: Neue Pinakothek, Munich, Germany

Plain near Auvers (original title: Ebene bei Auvers) is an oil on canvas painting created in 1890, by the Dutch post-Impressionist painter Vincent van Gogh. It is on permanent display at the Neue Pinakothek in Munich, Germany. It was acquired in 1929 from the art market Kunsthandel.

As the title implies, van Gogh painted the work while living in Auvers. At the time, the artist while undergoing treatment for depression with Paul Gachet.

== See also ==
- List of works by Vincent van Gogh
