= Farm with Stacks of Peat =

Painting by Vincent van Gogh

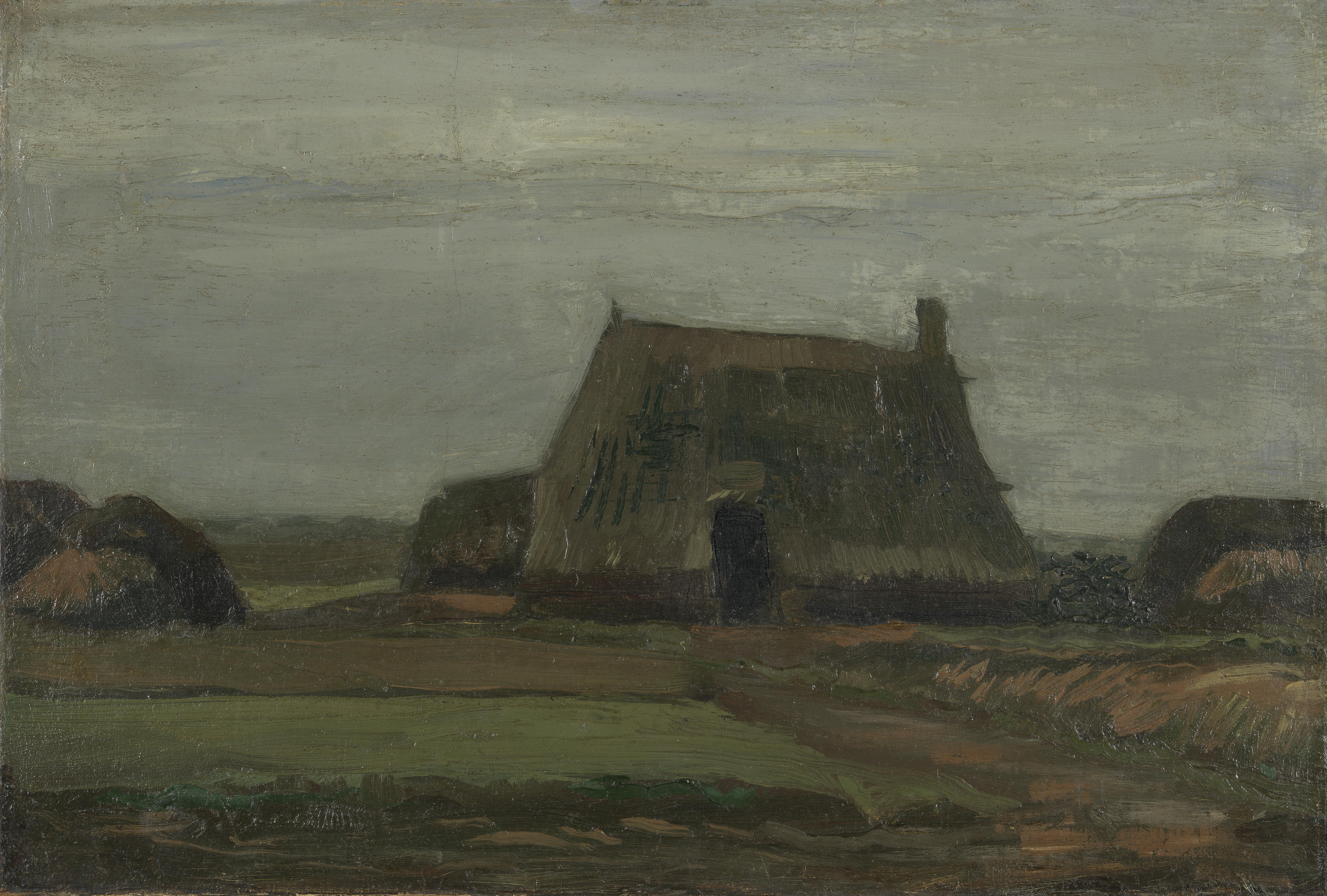
- Artist: Vincent van Gogh
- Year: 1883
- Catalogue: F22; JH421
- Medium: Oil on canvas
- Dimensions: 37.5 cm × 55.0 cm (14.8 in × 21.7 in)
- Location: Van Gogh Museum; Amsterdam

Farm with Stacks of Peat is an oil painting created by Vincent van Gogh in October or November 1883, early in his artistic career, and which is now in the collection of the Van Gogh Museum, Amsterdam. It was painted near the village of Nieuw-Amsterdam during the artist's short stay at Drenthe in the northern Netherlands.

== See also ==
- List of works by Vincent van Gogh
