= Farmhouses in Loosduinen near The Hague at Twilight =

Painting by Vincent van Gogh

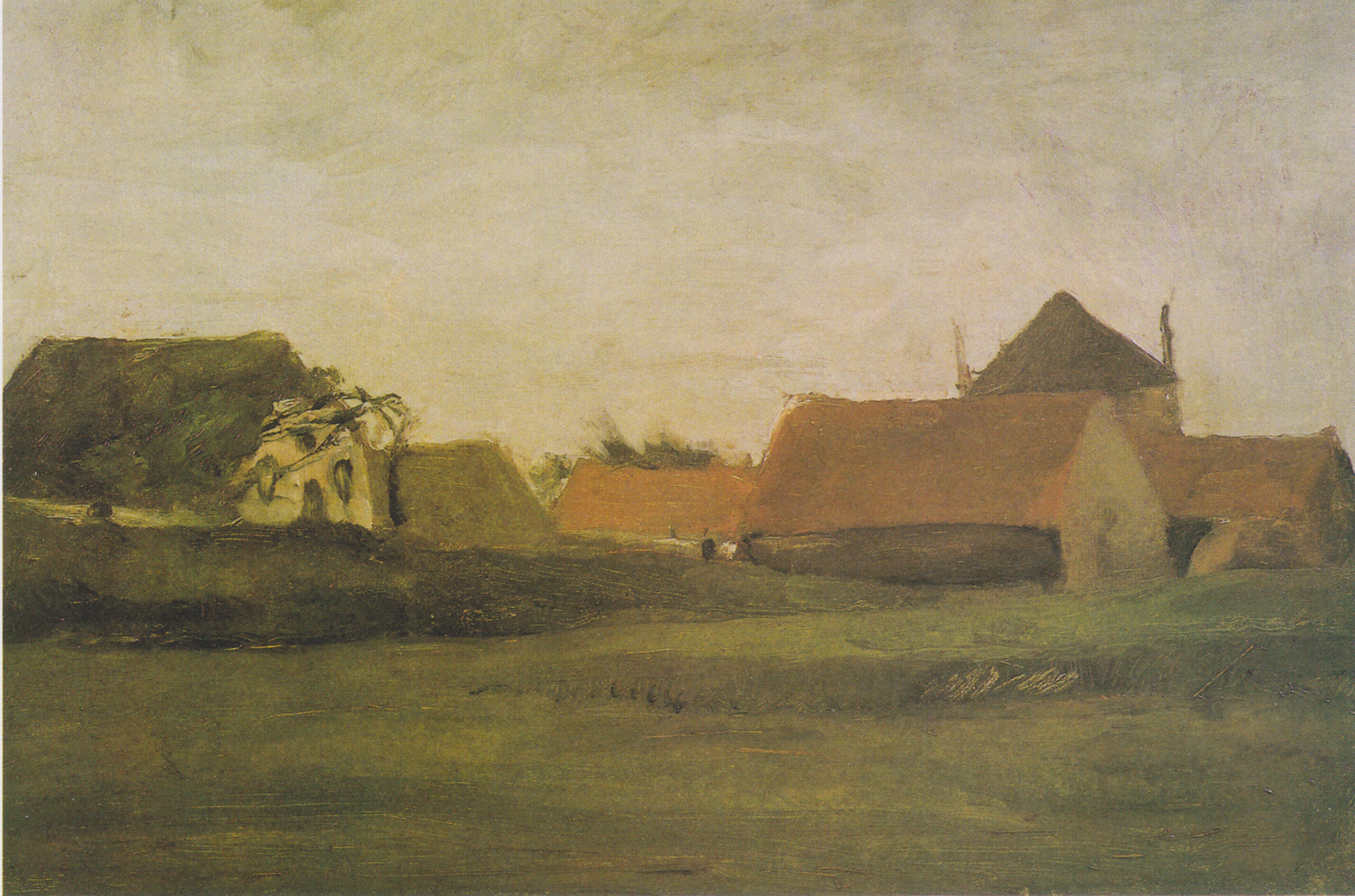
- Artist: Vincent van Gogh
- Year: 1883
- Catalogue: F16; JH391
- Medium: Oil on canvas
- Dimensions: 33.0 cm × 50.0 cm (13.0 in × 19.7 in)
- Location: Centraal Museum; Utrecht

Farmhouses in Loosduinen near The Hague at Twilight is an oil painting created in 1883 by Vincent van Gogh.

== See also ==
- List of works by Vincent van Gogh
