= Footbridge across a Ditch =

Painting by Vincent van Gogh

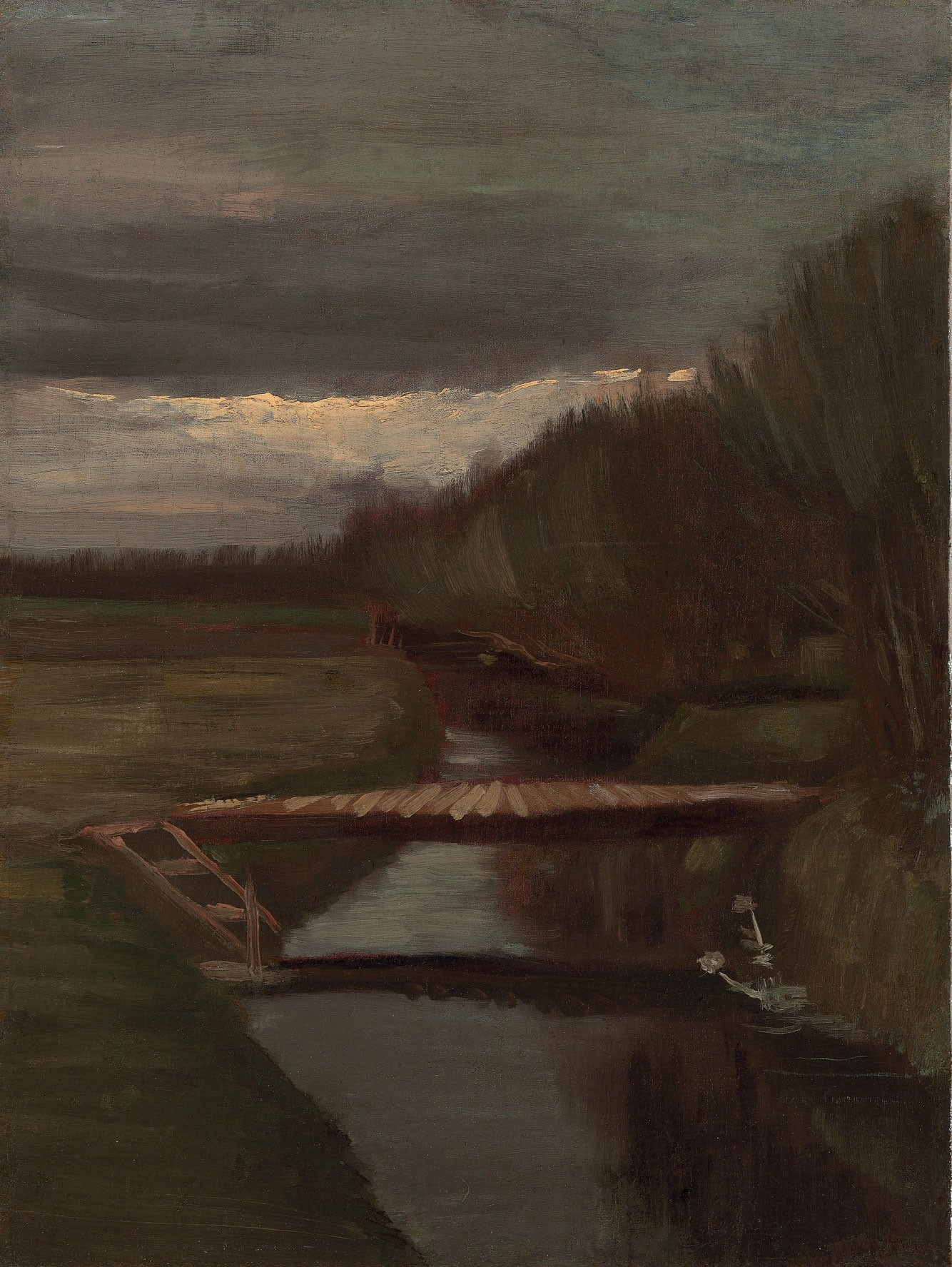
- Artist: Vincent van Gogh
- Year: 1883
- Catalogue: F189; JH386
- Medium: Oil on canvas
- Dimensions: 60.0 cm × 45.8 cm (23.6 in × 18.0 in)
- Location: Private collection

Footbridge across a Ditch or Ditch with a Little Bridge is an oil painting created in 1883 by Vincent van Gogh.

== See also ==
- List of works by Vincent van Gogh
