= Landscape with Dunes =

Painting by Vincent van Gogh

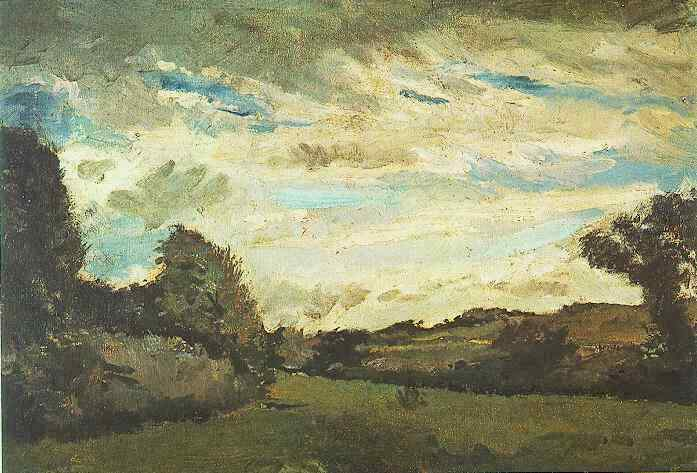
- Artist: Vincent van Gogh
- Year: 1883
- Catalogue: F15a; JH393
- Medium: Oil on panel
- Dimensions: 33.5 cm × 48.5 cm (13.2 in × 19.1 in)
- Location: Private collection

Landscape with Dunes or In the Dunes is an oil painting created in August 1883 by Vincent van Gogh during the time he lived at The Hague. It is currently held in a private collection.

== See also ==
- List of works by Vincent van Gogh
