= Bulb Fields =

Painting by Vincent van Gogh

- Flower Beds in Holland
- Artist: Vincent van Gogh
- Year: 1883
- Catalogue: F186; JH361
- Medium: oil on canvas on wood
- Movement: Realism
- Dimensions: 48.9 cm × 66 cm (19.25 in × 26 in)
- Location: National Gallery of Art; Washington D.C.

Bulb Fields, also known as Flower Beds in Holland, is an oil painting created by Vincent van Gogh in early 1883. It was donated to the National Gallery of Art in Washington DC in 1983.

Bulb Fields was Van Gogh's first garden painting, in oil paint on canvas mounted on wood. It was made in Van Gogh's second year in The Hague.

It depicts the rectangular plots of blue, yellow, pink and red hyacinths grown by a Dutch bulb merchant. The low vantage point creates a panoramic view of the field of colourful spring flowers, with thatched cottages and leafless trees in the background. The regular composition allows Van Gogh to explore his interest in perspective.

It seems likely that Van Gogh left the painting with other early works at his family's house in Nuenen in 1885, and then it accompanied his recently widowed mother and sister when they moved to Breda in early 1886. With other possessions, it was stored by a carpenter, Adrianus Schrauwen, who sold it along with other worthless "rubbish" in 1902 to the merchant J.C. Couvreur. It was exhibited at the Kunstzalon Oldenzeel in Rotterdam in 1902 with the title Tulpenland (Dutch: "Tulip country"), even though the flowers are hyacinths. It was bought by Jan Smit in 1905, and sold to his grandson John Enthoven in 1919. After passing through the hands of several art dealers, it was acquired by Paul Mellon from the Knoedler gallery in 1955. Mellon donated it to the National Gallery of Art in Washington DC in 1983.

== See also ==
- List of works by Vincent van Gogh
