= A Wind-Beaten Tree =

Painting by Vincent van Gogh

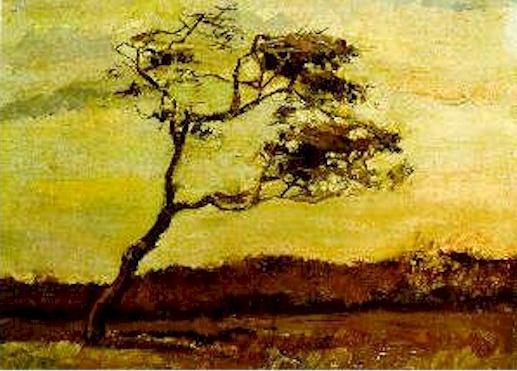
- Artist: Vincent van Gogh
- Year: 1883
- Catalogue: F10; JH384
- Medium: Oil on canvas
- Dimensions: 35.0 cm × 47.0 cm (13.8 in × 18.5 in)
- Location: Unknown, Stolen from a private collection

A Wind-Beaten Tree or A Windswept Tree is an oil painting created in August 1883 by Vincent van Gogh. It was painted early in his artistic career, whilst he was living in The Hague. It was stolen from a private collection in Zurich in 1997 and has not been recovered.

== See also ==
- List of works by Vincent van Gogh
- List of stolen paintings
