= Landscape with a Church at Twilight =

Painting by Vincent van Gogh

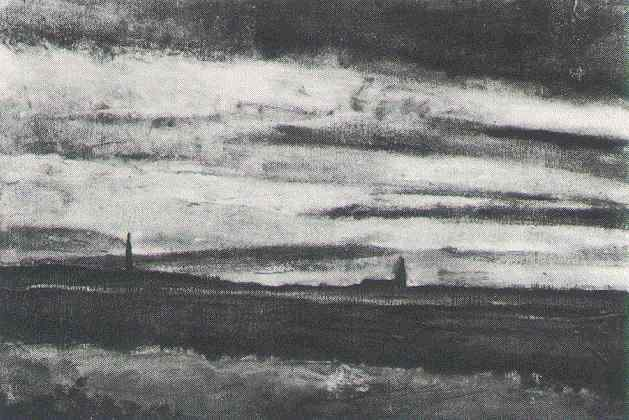
- Artist: Vincent van Gogh
- Year: 1883
- Catalogue: F188; JH413
- Medium: Oil on cardboard on panel
- Dimensions: 35 cm × 52 cm (14 in × 20 in)
- Location: Private collection

Landscape with a Church at Twilight is an oil painting study created in 1883 by Vincent van Gogh.

== See also ==
- List of works by Vincent van Gogh
