= Three Figures near a Canal with Windmill =

Painting by Vincent van Gogh

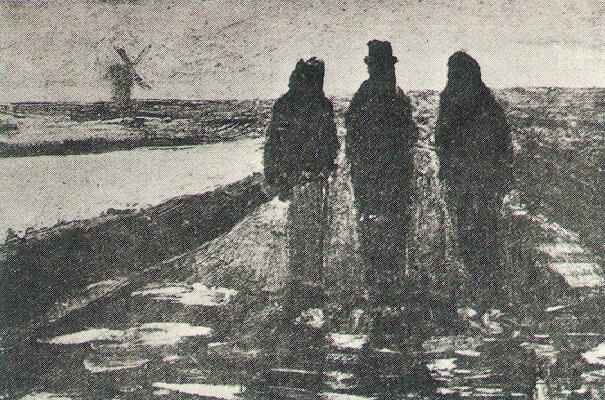
- Artist: Vincent van Gogh
- Year: 1883
- Catalogue: F1666; JH383
- Location: Unknown

Three Figures near a Canal with Windmill is an oil painting created in 1883 by Vincent van Gogh. It was stolen and has not been recovered.

== See also ==
- List of works by Vincent van Gogh
