= Cows in the Meadow =

Painting by Vincent van Gogh

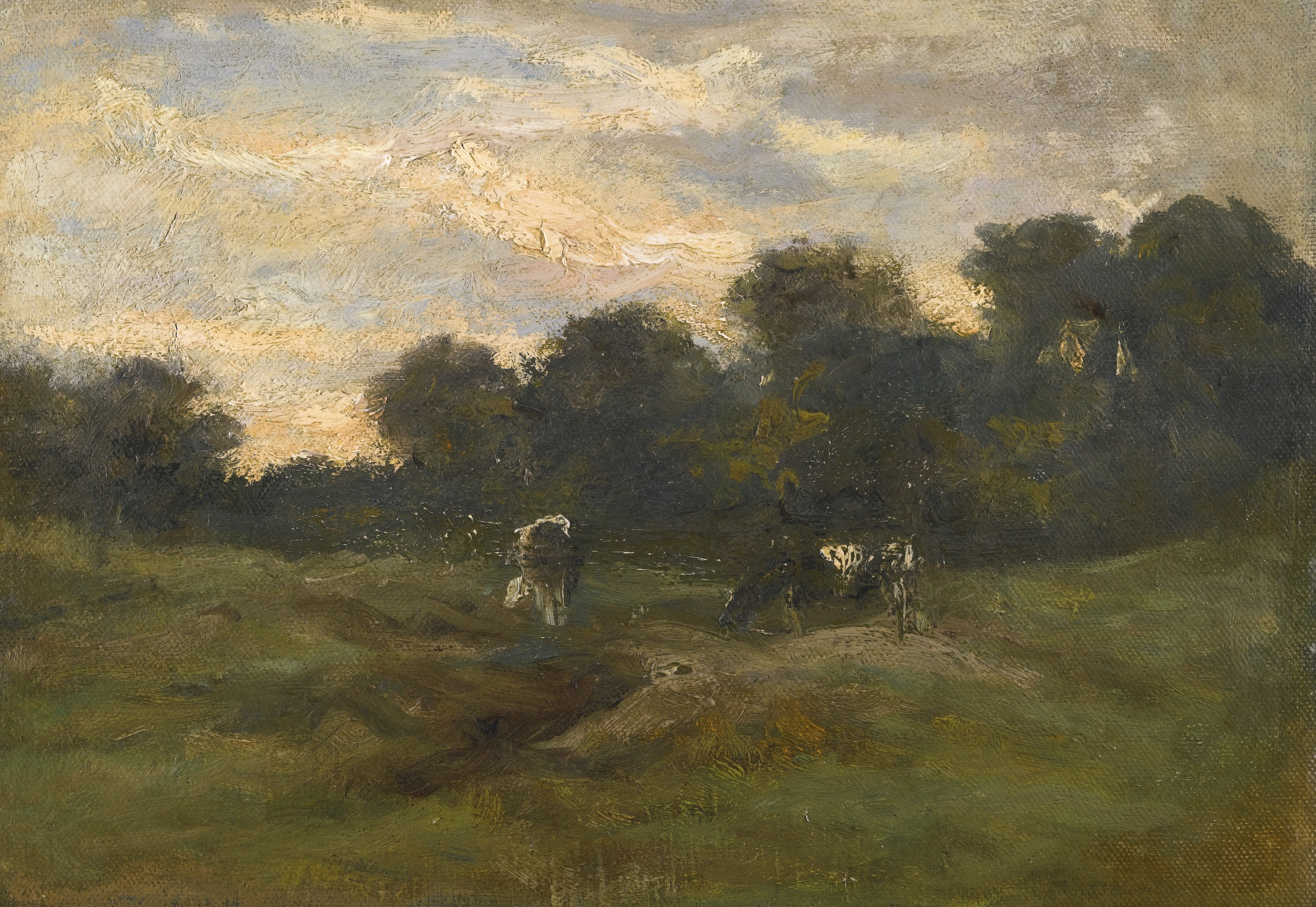
- Artist: Vincent van Gogh
- Year: 1883
- Catalogue: F15; JH387
- Medium: Oil on Canvas
- Dimensions: 31.5 cm × 44.0 cm (12.4 in × 17.3 in)
- Location: Private collection

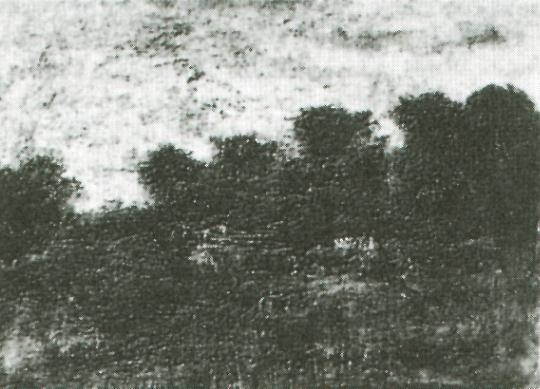
The poor quality photograph.

Cows in the Meadow is an oil painting created in 1883 by Vincent van Gogh. The painting was previously only known by a very poor photograph.

== See also ==
- List of works by Vincent van Gogh
