= Landscape with Trees =

Painting by Vincent van Gogh

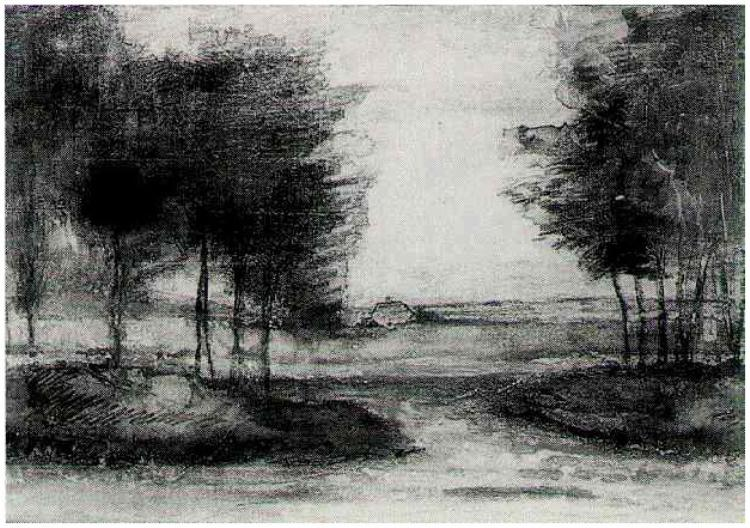
- Artist: Vincent van Gogh
- Year: 1883
- Catalogue: JH Add. 21
- Medium: Black chalk, Ink, and Watercolor
- Dimensions: 27.5 cm × 42 cm (10.8 in × 17 in)
- Owner: Private collection

Landscape with Trees is a watercolor piece created in 1883 by Vincent van Gogh. It was first shown at an exhibition in 1990 at the Kröller-Müller Museum in Otterlo in the Netherlands.

== See also ==
- Early works of Vincent van Gogh
- List of works by Vincent van Gogh
