= Sea of Storms =

Sea of Storms may refer to:

- Sea of Storms (The Wheel of Time), a location in the Wheel of Time fantasy series by Robert Jordan
- Oceanus Procellarum (Latin for "Ocean of Storms"), a large lunar mare on the Moon
- A location in the video game The Settlers II

== See also ==
- Stormy Sea (disambiguation)
- Storm (disambiguation)
- Sea (disambiguation)
