= Landscape with Wheelbarrow =

1883 painting by Vincent van Gogh

- Artist: Vincent van Gogh
- Year: 1883
- Medium: Watercolor and gouache over traces of graphite(?)
- Dimensions: 24.9 cm × 35.7 cm (9.8 in × 14.1 in)
- Location: Cleveland Museum of Art; Ohio

Landscape with Wheelbarrow is a watercolor on cream wove paper painting by the Dutch Post-Impressionist painter Vincent van Gogh. In 1883, Van Gogh painted a vast piece of land in emerald and chartreuse-like colors accompanied by a lonesome wheelbarrow in the middle ground along with red roofed cottages on the horizon line. The painting is accented with graphite. It is now in the Cleveland Museum of Art, Ohio.

== Drenthe, Netherlands ==
Van Gogh started this watercolor painting merely one year after beginning professional work as an artist. After a secret relationship with a woman known as Sien, whom his family did not approve of, Van Gogh left The Hague at the advice of his friends in September 1883. Van Gogh wanted to visit an area of open countryside and endless fields of green and reached a city named Drenthe, in north-east Netherlands to take inspiration from the wild landscape. This city was primarily known to be untouched by the Industrial Revolution. Van Gogh described the terrain as peaceful and beautiful: "What tranquility, what expanse, what calmness in this nature."

== Interpretations ==
In a letter to his brother Theo, in November 1883, Van Gogh wrote:

It was still very dark, though, when we got to Zweeloo at 6 o’clock in the morning — I saw the real Corots even earlier in the morning. The ride into the village was really so beautiful. Huge mossy roofs on houses, barns, sheepfolds, sheds. The dwellings here are very wide, among oak trees of a superb bronze. Tones of golden green in the moss, of reddish or bluish or yellowish dark lilac greys in the soil, tones of inexpressible purity in the green of the little wheat fields. Tones of black in the wet trunks, standing out against golden showers of whirling, swirling autumn leaves, which still hang in loose tufts, as if they were blown there, loosely and with the sky shining through them, on poplars, birches, limes, apple trees. The sky unbroken, clear, illuminating, not white but a lilac that cannot be deciphered, white in which one sees swirling red, blue, yellow, which reflects everything and one feels above one everywhere, which is vaporous and unites with the thin mist below. Brings everything together in a spectrum of delicate greys.

We can gather from his letter to his brother that the views from his whereabouts in Drenthe inspired Van Gogh to use select colors to complete the painting. It is poignant in its green hues with touches of yellow and strokes of grey and white that he stayed true to his descriptions while painting. Because his letters during the autumn season were in a positive tone we can interpret this painting as a real life version of what he was seeing and not a complete cast of sorrow that is assumed during his sojourn. Van Gogh mentions in his letter that the sky is unbroken and not white, but includes a lilac and swirls of blue, red, and yellow that can be seen in the top left of the painting and above the horizon line.

== Provenance ==
The dates of transfers and sales of the painting are unknown. However, the succession of ownership is as follows:

- Frans Kantorowicz, Berlin
- Galerie d'Art Lutz, Berlin
- Erich Schall, Berlin
- Galerie d'Art Artz et de Bois, La Haye
- Justin Thannhauser, New York
- Leonard C. Hanna, Jr., Cleveland, OH
- Bequeathed to the Cleveland Museum of Art in 1958

== Painting materials ==
This painting is uses both watercolor and opaque watercolor. The finished product has touches of graphite or a dark chalk as showcased in the outlines of the wheelbarrow. The colors in the painting have not been investigated but the interpretation of colors used include: emerald, chartreuse, lavender (horizon), copper (cottage roofs), as well as white and black.

Watercolor was not Van Gogh's initial medium, he was greatly known for his oil on canvas. In a letter to Theo, Van Gogh's brother, he wrote:

I wish you could see the two watercolours I have brought back with me, for you would realize that they are watercolours just like any other watercolours. They may still be full of imperfections, que soit, I am the first to say that I am still very dissatisfied with them, and yet they are quite different from what I have done before and look fresher and brighter. That doesn't alter the fact, however, that they must get fresher and brighter still, but one can't do everything one wants just like that. It will come little by little.

== See also ==
- Early works of Vincent van Gogh
- List of works by Vincent van Gogh
