= Peatery in Drenthe =

Watercolor painting by Vincent van Gogh

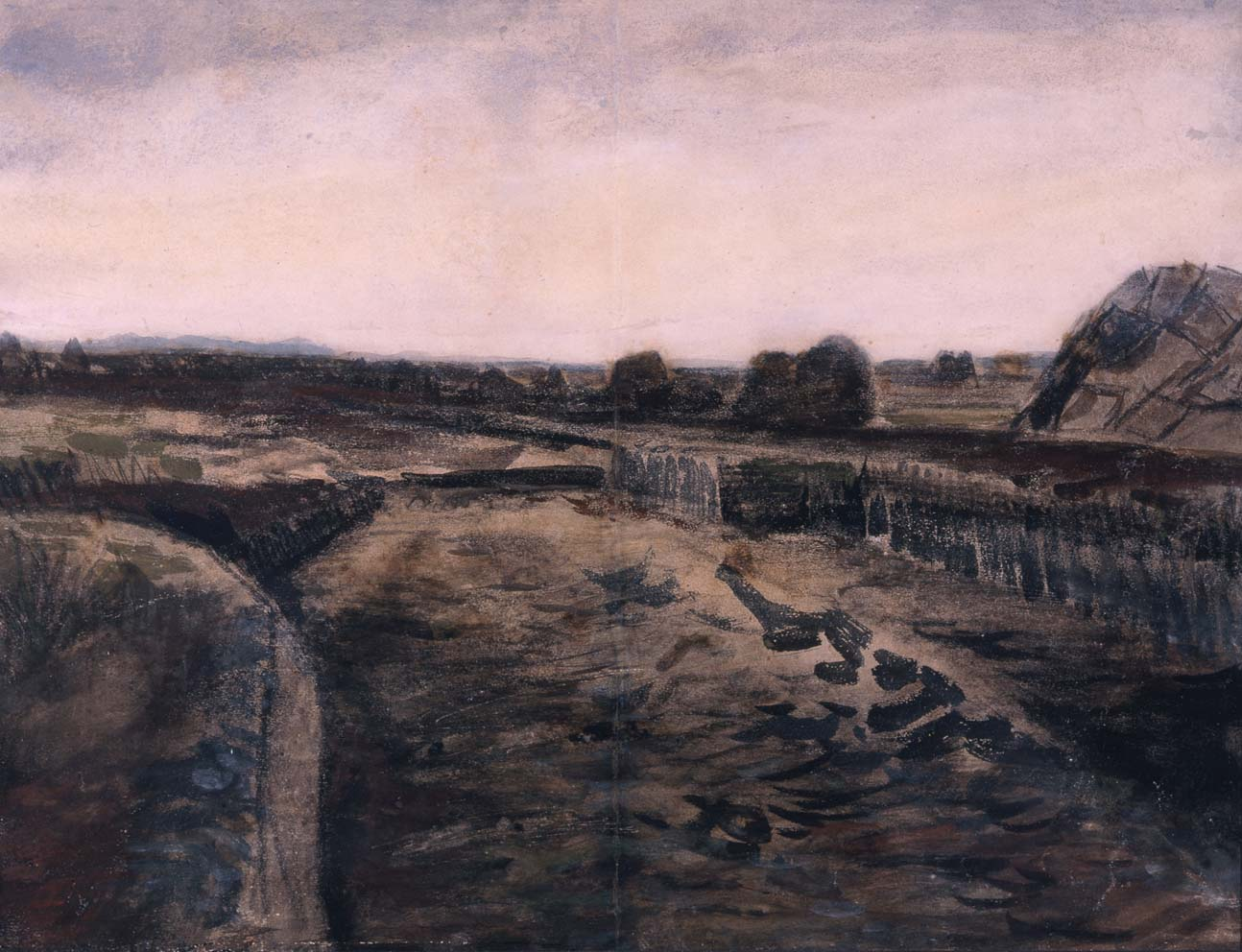
- Artist: Vincent van Gogh
- Year: October 1883
- Catalogue: F1094, JH398
- Medium: watercolor
- Dimensions: 40.5 cm × 54 cm (15.9 in × 21 in)
- Location: Museo Soumaya; Mexico City

Peatery in Drenthe or Peat Bog is a watercolor created by Dutch painter Vincent van Gogh in late 1883, during a period that he spent in Drenthe working on his watercolour technique to secure election to the Hollandsche Teekenmaatschappij (Dutch drawing society).

The early work measures 41 by 54 centimetres (16 in × 21 in). It shows a peat quarry in the evening, suggested by the pink skyline.

It was sold at Sotheby's in 2004 for £106,500.

== See also ==
- Early works of Vincent van Gogh
- List of works by Vincent van Gogh
