= Stormy Sea (Nolde) =

1930 painting by Emil Nolde

- Artist: Emil Nolde
- Year: 1930
- Medium: watercolor
- Dimensions: 34 cm × 45 cm (13 in × 18 in)
- Location: Sprengel Museum; Hanover

Stormy Sea is a watercolor landscape painting by German painter Emil Nolde, from 1930. The painting is held in the collection of the Sprengel Museum, in Hanover.

== Description ==
This piece has organic lines and there are many spots of bright colors, in particular blues and oranges. There are two boats on the horizon and a steam boat off to the right side which is a nod to modernism and industrialization. The bright fiery orange on the horizon gives a sense of drama to the piece and the white color in the foreground shows the crests of the moving waves. The waves juxtaposed against the fiery horizon animate the painting, and the colors help to depict the tumultuous waves. The orange light in the sky imbues energy and excitement against the dark blue waters.

== Nolde's technique ==
Watercolor was Nolde’s primary medium from the 1930s until his death. The medium appealed to Nolde because he could translate his ideas and concepts to creation faster than oil painting. According to Peter Selz, Nolde elevated watercolor far above the level of a specialized technique and achieved works of breathtaking and ephemeral beauty which stand unique in the history of twentieth-century art. His use of color conveys movement and emotion, and the mysterious quality of painting is typical of the Die Brücke style. Nolde’s landscapes are not mere pictures of mood or reflections of the changing atmosphere of a year or a day, but are meant to be truly ‘landscapes of the soul’, the free and direct expression of artistic and human experience.

Nolde said about his paintings, “To the annoyance of art historians I shall destroy all lists that give information about the dates of my pictures.” His wife, Ada Nolde, kept a precise catalog of his oil paintings but not of his watercolors.

== Nolde's reception ==
His work was condemned in the III Reich as Degenerate Art. Nolde was forbidden to paint even though he was a Nazi supporter. During this time many of his works were removed from German museums by the Nazi Party.
