= Marshy Landscape =

Painting by Vincent van Gogh

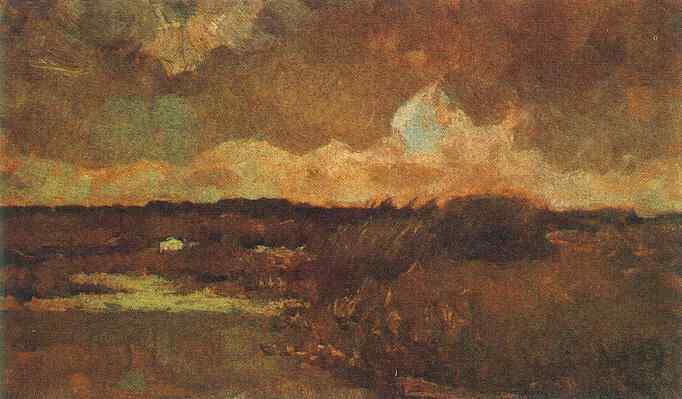
- Artist: Vincent van Gogh
- Year: May 1883
- Catalogue: JH 394
- Medium: Oil on canvas
- Dimensions: 27 cm × 45.5 cm (11 in × 17.9 in)
- Location: Private collection

Marshy Landscape is an oil painting created in 1883 by Vincent van Gogh.

== Description ==
From 1883 to 1885, van Gogh lived in Drenthe, a remote district of the Netherlands, flat and riven with canals, a landscape of marsh and mist. Throughout 1883, the artist worked on his series of peasants' cottages, exploring the local terrain of marshes and peat fields, ditches and canals. Like much of his work of this period, Marshy Landscape is rendered with subdued earthy tones, giving the impression of being painted with the very soil itself. Alone in the wilderness, Vincent drew upon the power of nature, the stillness and silence of the marshes inspiring him. He wrote to his brother Theo:

Went further into the peat fields last week — marvellous scenes, the longer I stay here the more beautiful I find it, and from the outset I’ll try to stay here in this region. For it’s so beautiful here that at the same time a great deal of study is needed to capture it, and only solid work can give a truer understanding of things as they are at bottom, and of their serious, sober nature.

== See also ==
- Early works of Vincent van Gogh
- List of works by Vincent van Gogh
