= Cliffs at Étretat =

Series of oil paintings by Claude Monet

Cliffs at Étretat is a series of about fifty oil paintings by Claude Monet. The series depicts the chalk cliffs of Étretat, a commune along the northern coast of France. The works depict the seaside town's limestone cliffs and sea arches under varying times of day and weather conditions, reflecting Monet's growing interest in serial views of a single motif. The Étretat paintings are regarded by art historians as a pivotal stage in Monet's career, marking the transition from his earlier Impressionist practice to the sustained observation of light and atmosphere that defined his later work.

== Background ==
Étretat is a coastal town in Normandy, northern France, known for its dramatic chalk cliffs and natural rocks shaped by erosion. The shoreline features two prominent natural arches, the Porte d'Amont to the northeast and the Porte d'Aval to the southwest, the latter accompanied by a spire known as the Aiguille ("The Needle"), which rises more than seventy meters from the water.

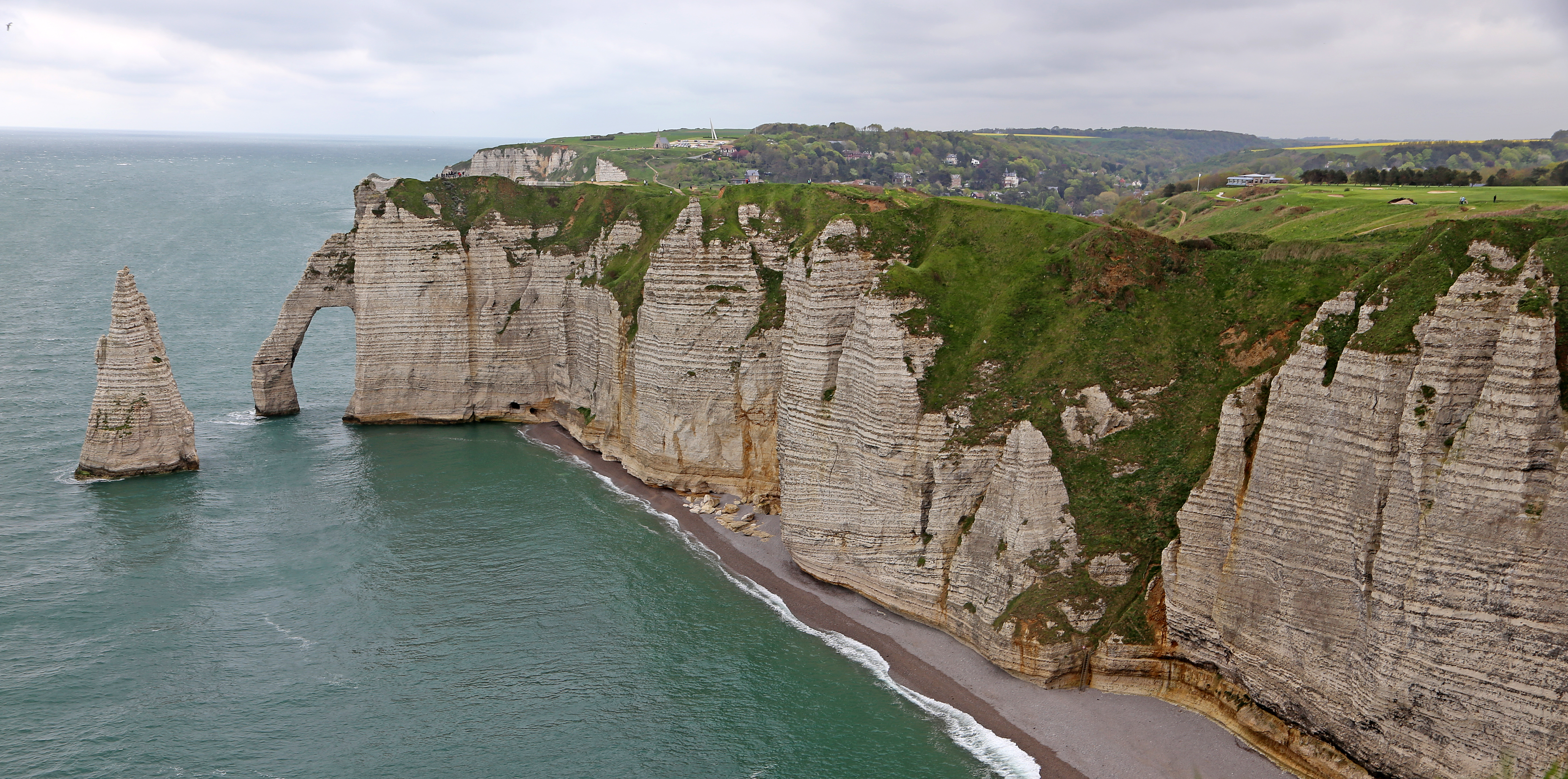
Porte d'Aval with "The Needle" on the left, situated further into the water.

By the mid-nineteenth century, Étretat had become a popular destination for tourists, writers, and artists. Eugéne Delacroix and Gustave Courbet had painted the cliffs before Monet, helping to establish the site as a modern landscape subject. Courbet's seascapes from the 1860s emphasized the physical textures of rock and surf, reflecting the Realist artistic movement's interest in unidealized natural forms.

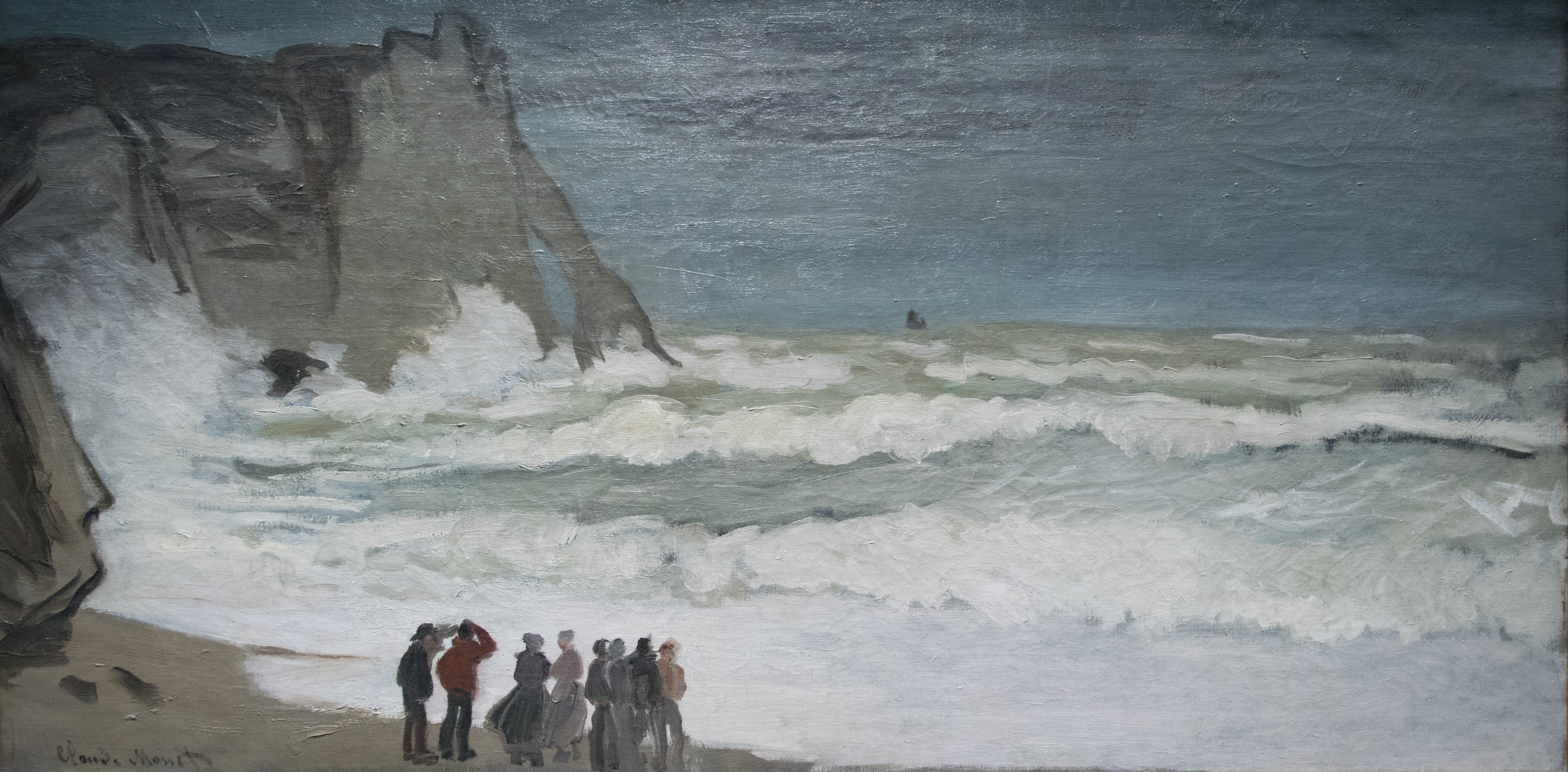
Stormy Sea at Étretat, 1868–69

Monet was familiar with these works and visited Étretat in the winter of 1868-1869 with his first wife, Camille, and their young son Jean. During this stay, he painted Stormy Sea at Étretat (Musée d'Orsay), one of his earliest explorations of the site and its dramatic coastal conditions.

== Monet at Étretat ==
Monet returned to Étretat repeatedly in the 1880s, working for extended periods between 1883 and 1886. Earlier coastal works from Sainte-Adresse and Trouville had included promenaders and villas, but at Étretat, he focused almost entirely on the cliffs, arches, and shoreline. By typically eliminating human presence, Monet emphasized the interaction of rock, sea, and sky as the primary subjects of the series.

During these campaigns he often rented rooms at the Hôtel Blanquet, where he could study the coastline directly from his window. Many canvases were begun outdoors and later reworked in his Giverny studio. This back-and-forth process sometimes lasted months, and some works remained with the artist for years before he considered them finished.

Monet’s personal circumstances also shaped these campaigns. During this time, he lived in Giverny with Alice Hoschedé and their blended family of eight children from previous marriages, a domestic arrangement complicated by Alice’s still-legal marriage to her estranged husband Ernest Hoschedé. Letters from this period describe his dependence on Alice to manage the household in his absence and his continual need to produce and sell work to support the family.

Monet also maintained close correspondence with his dealer Paul Durant-Ruel during this period, after resuming a regular working relationship in 1881. Durand-Ruel provided advances for painting materials and the purchase of works still in progress. Monet kept him informed of his Étretat paintings through frequent correspondence, sometimes requesting additional funds for household expenses. His letters from these years offer detailed insight into his daily frustrations, including storms, shifting tides, and rapidly changing light that often forced him to stop and restart canvases. In March 1884 he wrote: “It always seems to me that in beginning again I will do better,” a remark that reflects both his dissatisfaction and his commitment to serial observation.

== Painting techniques ==
The Étretat paintings illustrate Monet's plein-air method, which required rapid adjustments as weather and tide altered the scene. He often worked on multiple canvases in a single session to track changing atmospheric conditions before refining them in the studio.

The series also demonstrates the exposed, individual brushwork associated with early Impressionism. Thick strokes articulate the mass of the cliffs, while broken, directional marks evoke the shimmer of light on the sea. Monet’s handling at Étretat was frequently described as spontaneous, yet the structure of the compositions shows careful planning. Contemporary accounts and technical analyses indicate that the apparent immediacy of individual strokes was balanced by deliberate placement of related hues and values, like placing greens and purples of similar intensity next to one another in the water, to avoid abrupt transitions and maintain overall coherence.

Monet’s palette in these works tends toward subdued tones, though certain canvases incorporate more intense, chemically derived pigments for heightened contrasts. The visible brushwork, lack of traditional modeling, and emphasis on the physical gesture of painting merge the external scene with the artist’s subjective perception.

Several compositions required considerable physical effort to obtain specific viewpoints. Some coastal vantage points were accessible only at low tide or by climbing the promontory above the Porte d’Amont and descending the rocky shoreline. These chosen viewpoints shaped the resulting works, which balance direct observation with Monet’s existing ideas of what constituted a compelling pictorial structure.

Although many later Étretat paintings omit figures, earlier works such as Stormy Sea at Étretat include groups of local inhabitants rather than fashionable tourists. Their presence provides scale and situates the viewer alongside residents accustomed to judging the severity of the weather, reinforcing the painting’s sense of immediacy and local knowledge.

== Reception and legacy ==
Paintings from the Étretat campaigns were shown in Paris in the mid-1880s in exhibitions organized by Durand-Ruel. Viewers encountered multiple views of the same motif of arches, cliffs, and the Aiguille hung together, enabling comparison across changing conditions. Reactions at the time were mixed: some critics admired the dramatic treatment of natural forces, while others found the repetition unpersuasive or overly experimental.

The series is seen as a precursor to Monet’s later explorations of shifting light in the same motif, like the Haystacks, Rouen Cathedral, and Water Lilies series. The paintings have appeared in major retrospectives and exhibitions devoted to Monet’s work on the Normandy coast, and many works from the Étretat series are now held in major museums around the world, including the Metropolitan Museum of Art, Musée d'Orsay, and the National Gallery of Canada.

== Selected paintings from the series ==
Image	Name	Year	Size	Museum
	Sunset at Étretat (W 817)	1883	55 × 81 cm	North Carolina Museum of Art
	Sunset at Étretat (W 818)	1883	66 × 71 cm	Museum of Fine Arts of Nancy
	Stormy Sea at Étretat (W 821)	1883	81 × 100 cm	Museum of Fine Arts of Lyon
	The Cliff and the Porte d'Aval, Rough Seas (W 820)	1883	73 × 100 cm	Museum of Montserrat
	The Manneporte (Étretat) (W 822)	1883	75 × 103 cm	Wallraf-Richartz-Museum
	Aiguille and Porte d’Aval, Étretat - Sunset (W P77)	1883–1885	18 × 40 cm	Private collection
	The Manneporte (Etretat) (W 832)	1883	65 × 81 cm	Metropolitan Museum of Art
	Étretat, the Manneporte, Reflections on Water (W 1038)	1885	62 × 81,5 cm	Musée des Beaux-Arts de Caen
	The Manne-Porte, Étretat (W 1037)	1885	65 × 81 cm	Philadelphia Museum of Art
	The Falaise d'Aval, Étretat (W 1019)	1885	65 × 92 cm	Israel Museum
	The Rock Needle seen through the Porte d'Aval (W 1049)	1885	65 × 92 cm	National Gallery of Canada
	Étretat, the Porte d'Aval : Fishing Boats Leaving Port (W 1047)	1885	50 × 37 cm	Museum of Fine Arts of Dijon
	Cliffs at Étretat (W 1034)	1885	65 × 81 cm	Clark Art Institute
	Rainy Weather, Étretat (W 1044)	1886	73 × 60 cm	National Gallery of Norway
	Cliffs at Étretat or Fishing Boats Leaving Etretat (W 1046)	1886	66 × 81 cm	Pushkin Museum
	The Manneporte near Étretat (W 1052)	1886	81 × 65 cm	Metropolitan Museum of Art

== See also ==
- List of paintings by Claude Monet
