= Jacob Baart de la Faille =

Dutch art critic (1886–1959)

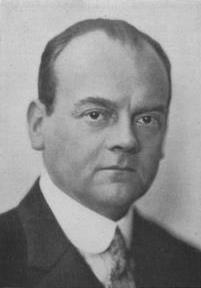
Baart de la Faille

Jacob Baart de la Faille (1 June 1886 – 7 August 1959) was a Dutch art historian and jurist best known for compiling the first catalogue raisonné of the work of Vincent van Gogh, published in 1928. The catalogue was revised and republished by an editorial committee in 1970, and this version is considered to be the definitive catalogue of van Gogh's work.

His catalogue numbers are preceded by an "'F": thus The Starry Night is designated F612.

Shortly after the publication of the original catalogue, de la Faille became involved in a major fraud affair concerning the Berlin art dealer Otto Wacker. De la Faille had certified the authenticity of 30 paintings which were later determined to be fakes.

== Biography ==
Jacob-Baart de la Faille was born in Leeuwarden to a Dutch father, Cornelis Baart de la Faille, and a Belgian mother, Henriette Adriana Krayenhoff. At the University of Utrecht he majored in law, not in art. He died in Heemstede.

== Writings ==
- J.-B. de La Faille: L'Epoque française de Van Gogh, MM. Bernheim-Jeune, éditeurs d'art, Paris ("acheve d'imprimer le 25 aout 1927")
- J.-B. de la Faille: L'Œuvre de Vincent van Gogh, catalogue raisonné, ouvrage accompagné de la reproduction de plus de 1.600 tableaux, dessins, aquarelles et gravures du Maître. 6 vols. Les Éditions G. van Oest, Paris & Bruxelles, 1928

2nd edition, revising the catalogue of paintings only, Hyperion, Paris 1937 (comprising editions in English, French, and German)
3rd edition, edited since 1961 by a committee initially including J. G. van Gelder, W. Jos de Gruyter, A. M. Hammacher (chairman), Jan Hulsker and H. Gerson, in 1962 joined by Annet Tellegen-Hoogendoorn, later by Martha Op de Coul and, due to time passing, by others

- J.-B. de la Faille: Les faux Van Gogh, avec 176 reproductions. Les Éditions G. van Oest, Paris & Bruxelles, 1930
