= Jan Hulsker =

Dutch art historian (1907–2002)

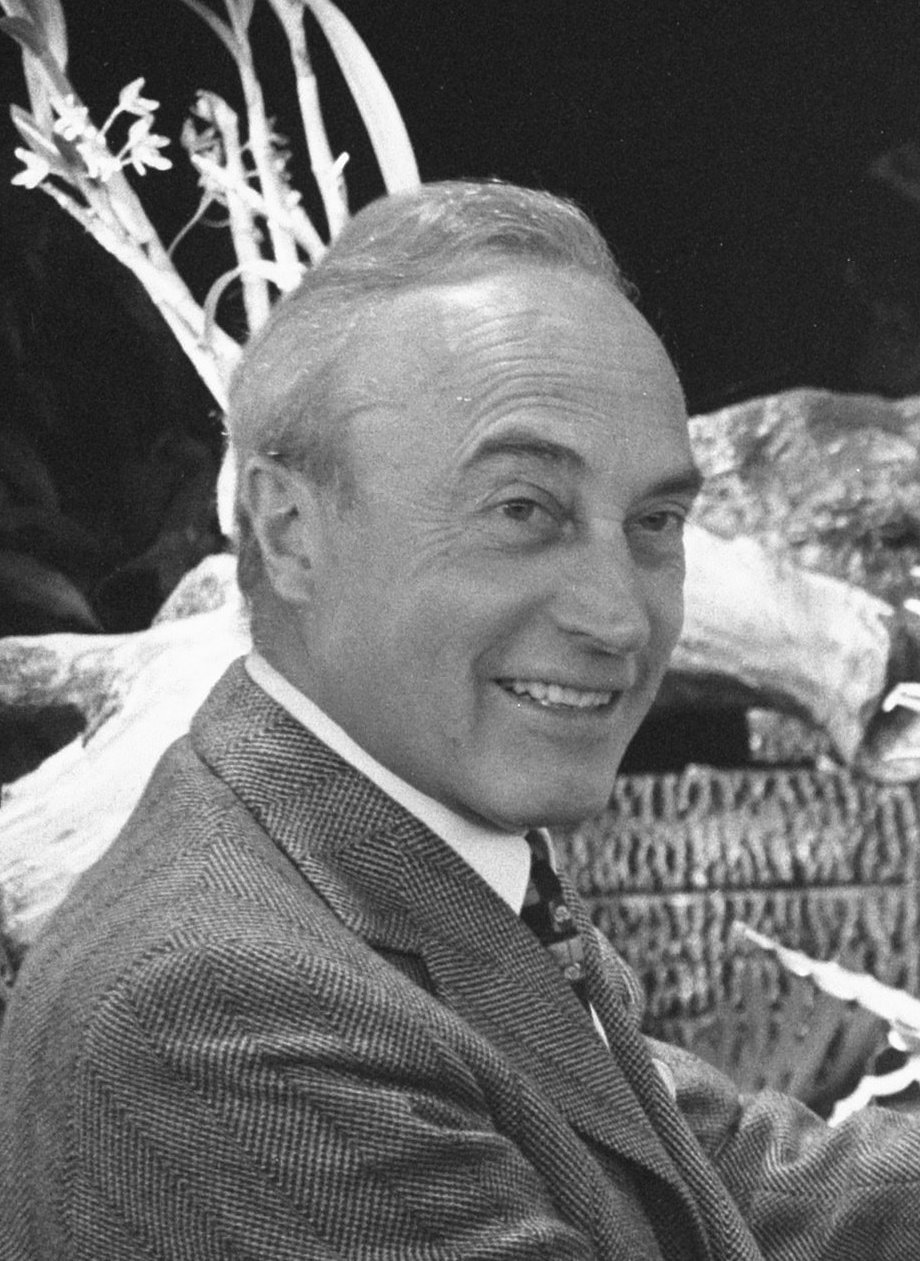
Jan Hulsker (1972)

Jan Hulsker (2 October 1907, The Hague – 9 November 2002, Vancouver) was a Dutch art historian especially noted for his work on Vincent van Gogh. He studied Dutch literature in Leiden and was promoted with a thesis on the author Aart van der Leeuw. In 1953, he was appointed to the Ministerie van Cultuur, Recreatie en Maatschappelijk werk, in charge of the art department. In 1959, he became general director in charge of culture at large (directeur-generaal voor culturele zaken). The establishment of the Vincent van Gogh Foundation and the Van Gogh Museum in Amsterdam were among his major tasks.

From the 1950s, Hulsker contributed to Van Gogh research, concentrating on the dating of Van Gogh's correspondence. In 1973, Hulsker's most important study was published, Van Gogh door Van Gogh, which has not been translated from the Dutch.

He is the author of an acknowledged catalogue raisonné of Van Gogh's work, published in 1977, revised in 1984 and again in 1996. His catalogue numbers are preceded by a "JH": thus JH1731 refers to the 1889 oil painting The Starry Night (previously catalogued by Jacob Baart de la Faille as F612). Hulsker warned that numerous forgeries were passing as Van Goghs.

In the 1980s, Hulsker left the Netherlands and settled in Vancouver, British Columbia, Canada, where he died in 2002.

== Books ==
- Hulsker, Jan. Vincent and Theo van Gogh; A dual biography. Ann Arbor: Fuller Publications, 1990. ISBN 0-940537-05-2
- Hulsker, Jan. The Complete Van Gogh. Oxford: Phaidon, 1980. ISBN 0-7148-2028-8.

== Sources ==
- Short biography
