= Cottages (Van Gogh series) =

Painting series by Vincent van Gogh

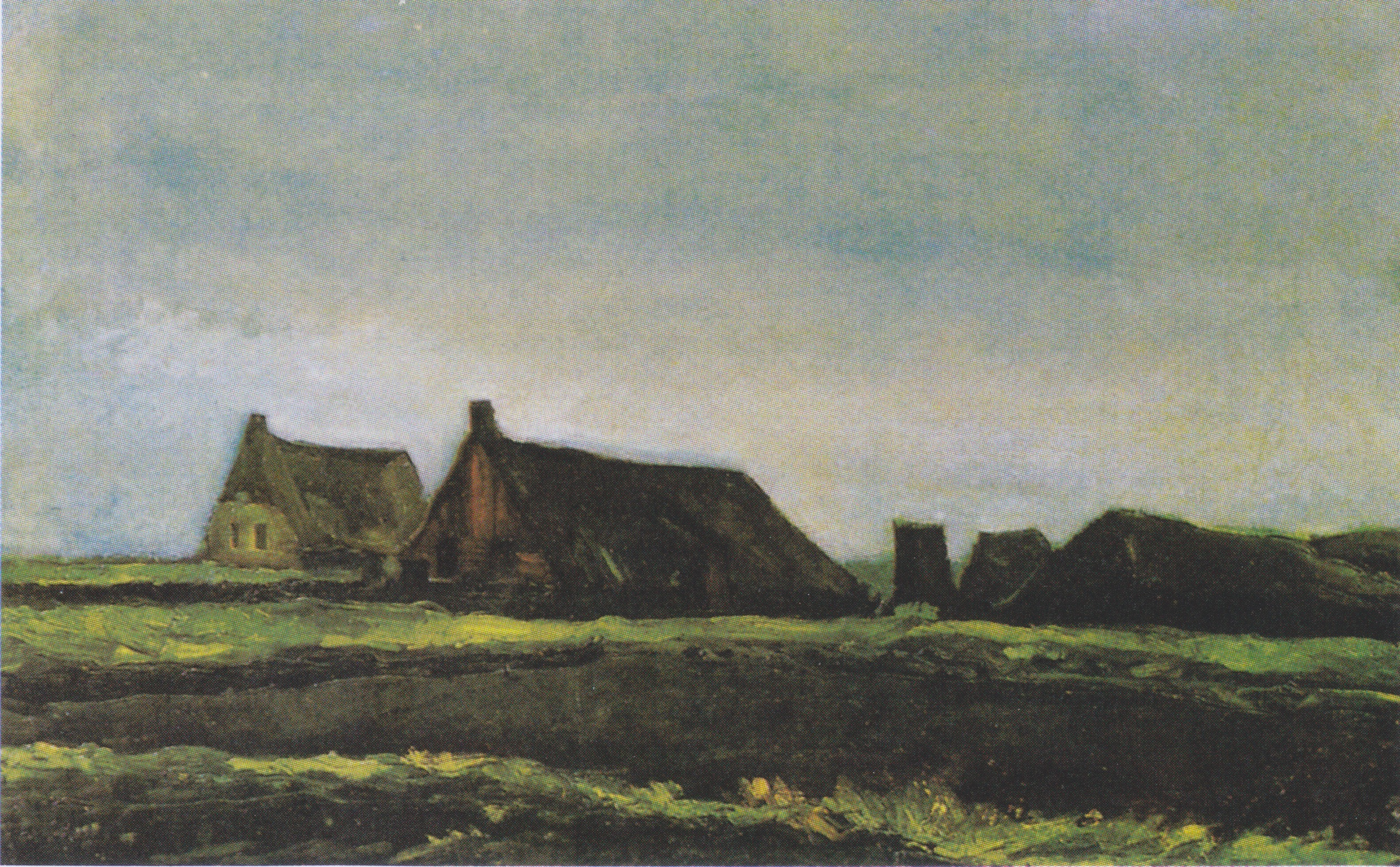
Cottages, 1883, Van Gogh Museum, Amsterdam (F17)

Cottages is a subject of paintings created by Vincent van Gogh from 1883 and 1885. This is related to the Peasant Character Studies that Van Gogh worked on during the same time period.

== Background ==
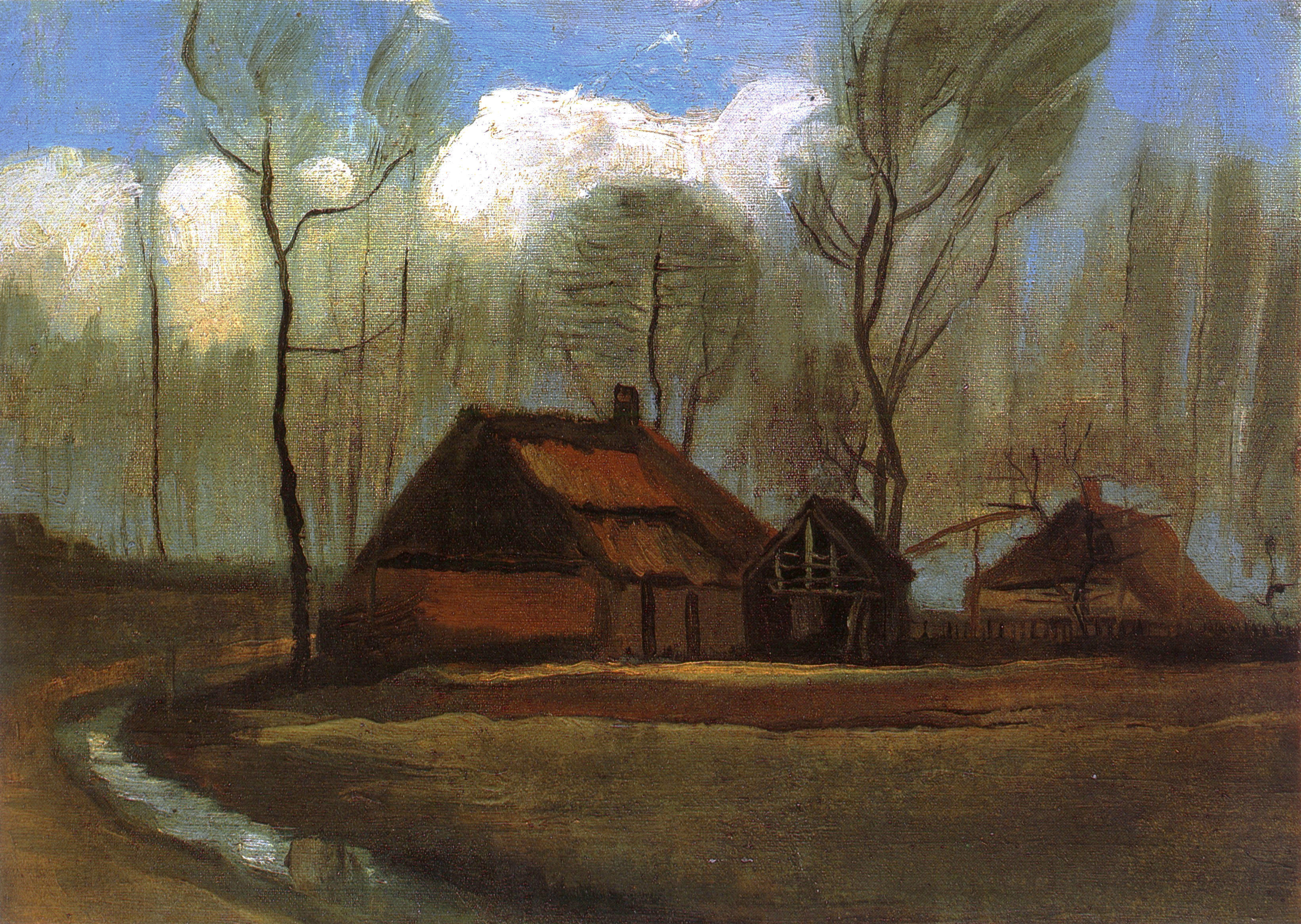
Farmhouse Among Trees, 1883, Museum Kolekcji Jana Pawla II, Warsaw, Poland (F18)

Inspired by the work of Jean-François Millet and others working in the 'peasant' genre, Van Gogh became interested in representing peasant life in his art. To depict the essence and spirit of their life, he for a time lived as they lived, he was in the fields as they were, enduring the weather for long hours as they were. To do so was not something taught in art schools, he wrote, a reflection of his frustrated by traditionalists who focused on technique more than the essence of the subject matter.

So thoroughly was he engaged in living the peasant lifestyle that his appearance and manner of speech began to change. This alienated some of his friends and family, but was a cost, he believed, necessary for his artistic development.

== Drenthe ==
Van Gogh visited the province of Drenthe for three months, staying in Nieuw-Amsterdam. While there, he explored the countryside still untouched by progress found in larger towns and cities. Cottages (F17) is a study of farm cottages and an outbuilding that Van Gogh found on one of his treks. The dark cottage is set against the evening sky. Here he was greatly impressed by the working poor, but unable to find models for his character studies.

== Nuenen ==
In 1882, Van Gogh's father became pastor in Nuenen and the family lived at the vicarage at Nuenen, a small village in the North Brabant district of the Netherlands. Having been in Drenthe for several months, Van Gogh came to live with his parents in December 1883 and stayed there until May 1885.

During the winter in Nuenen Van Gogh worked on character studies of the local peasants. There was little to be done in the fields and Van Gogh was able to make connections to people through his father, a town minister. Van Gogh's character studies culminated in his famous painting The Potato Eaters.

The Cottage (F83) was a home that the De Groot family, immortalized in The Potato Eaters, shared with another family. The cottage has double front doors, a split chimney and quarters for two families. Seen in the evening light, the cottage seems peaceful. Van Gogh called the peasant homes "human nests".

Peasant Woman Digging in Front of Her Cottage (F142) was one of the paintings that Van Gogh left behind when he went to Antwerp in 1885, and it went to his mother Anna Carbentus van Gogh.

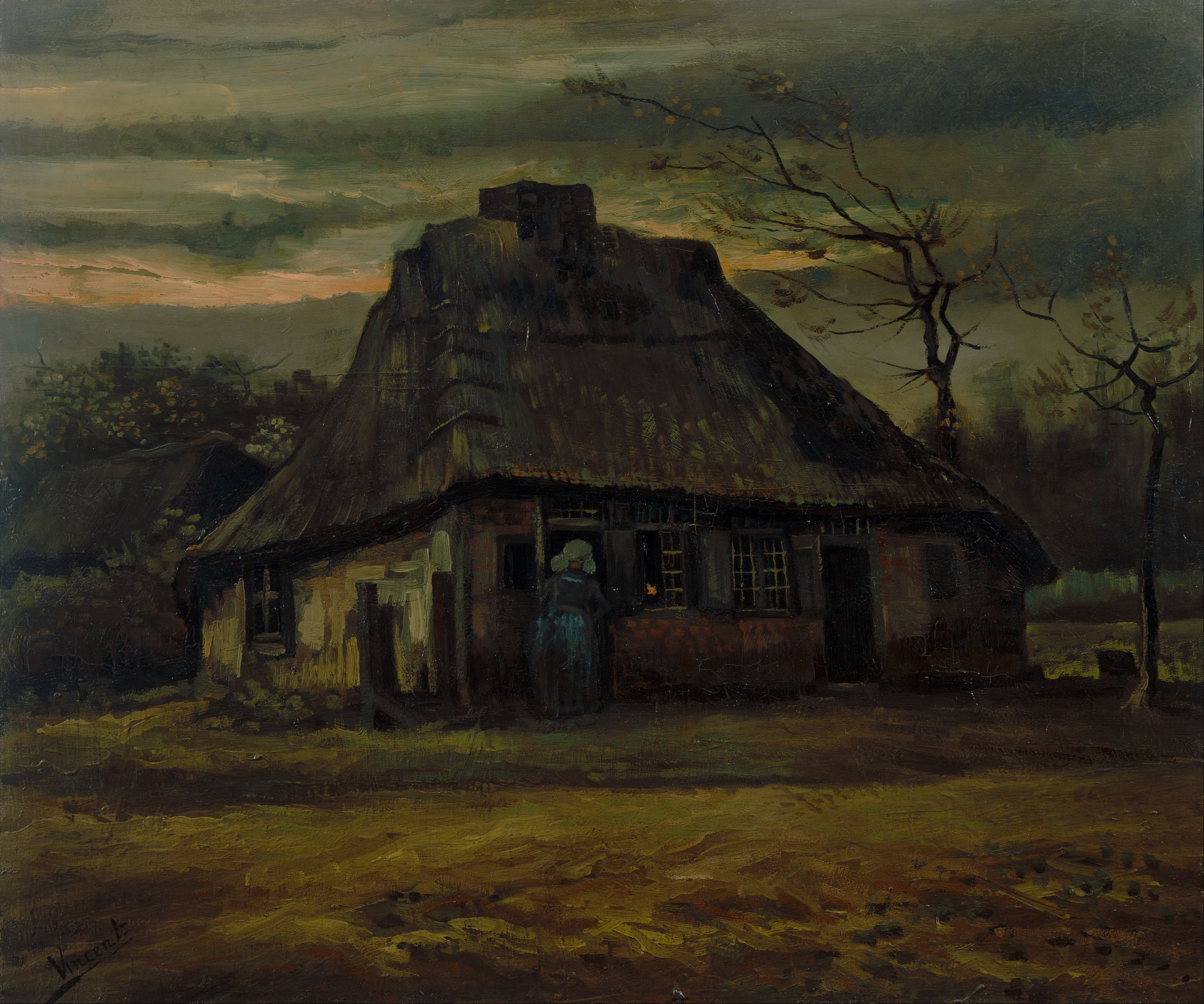
Cottage, 1885, Van Gogh Museum, Amsterdam (F83)

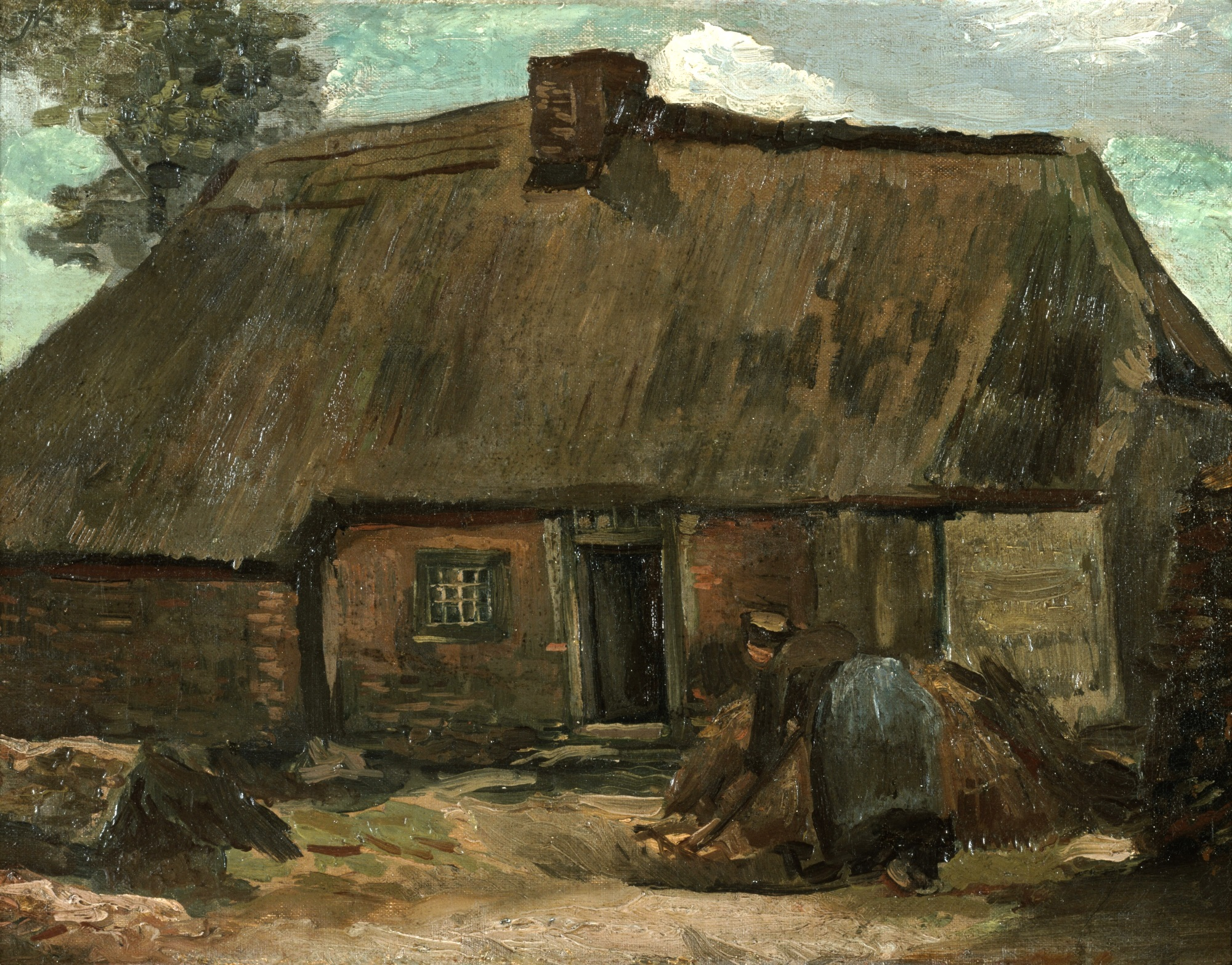
Cottage with Peasant Woman Digging, 1885, Tokyo Fuji Art Museum (F89)

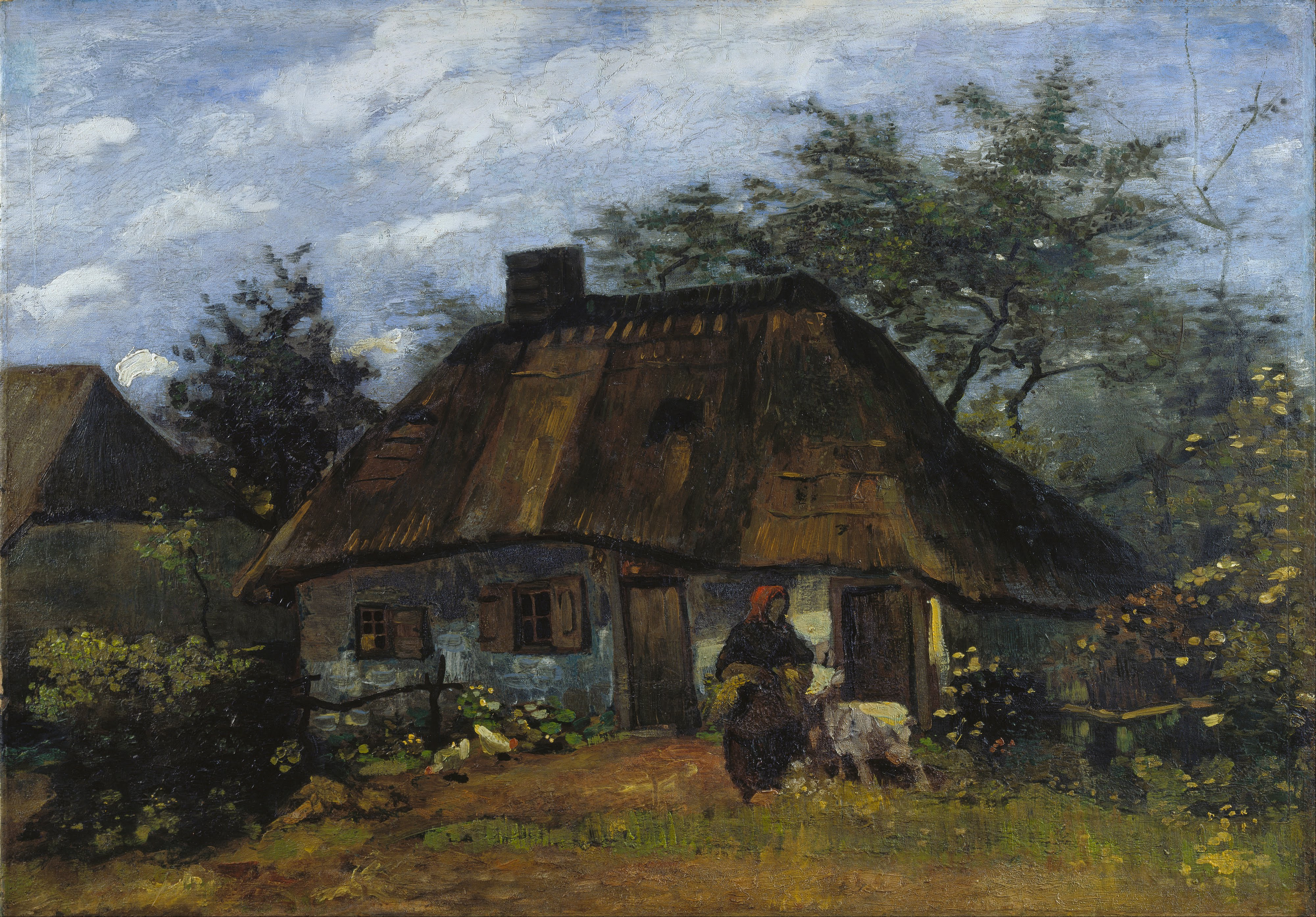
Cottage and Woman with Goat, 1885, Städel, Frankfort, Germany (F90)

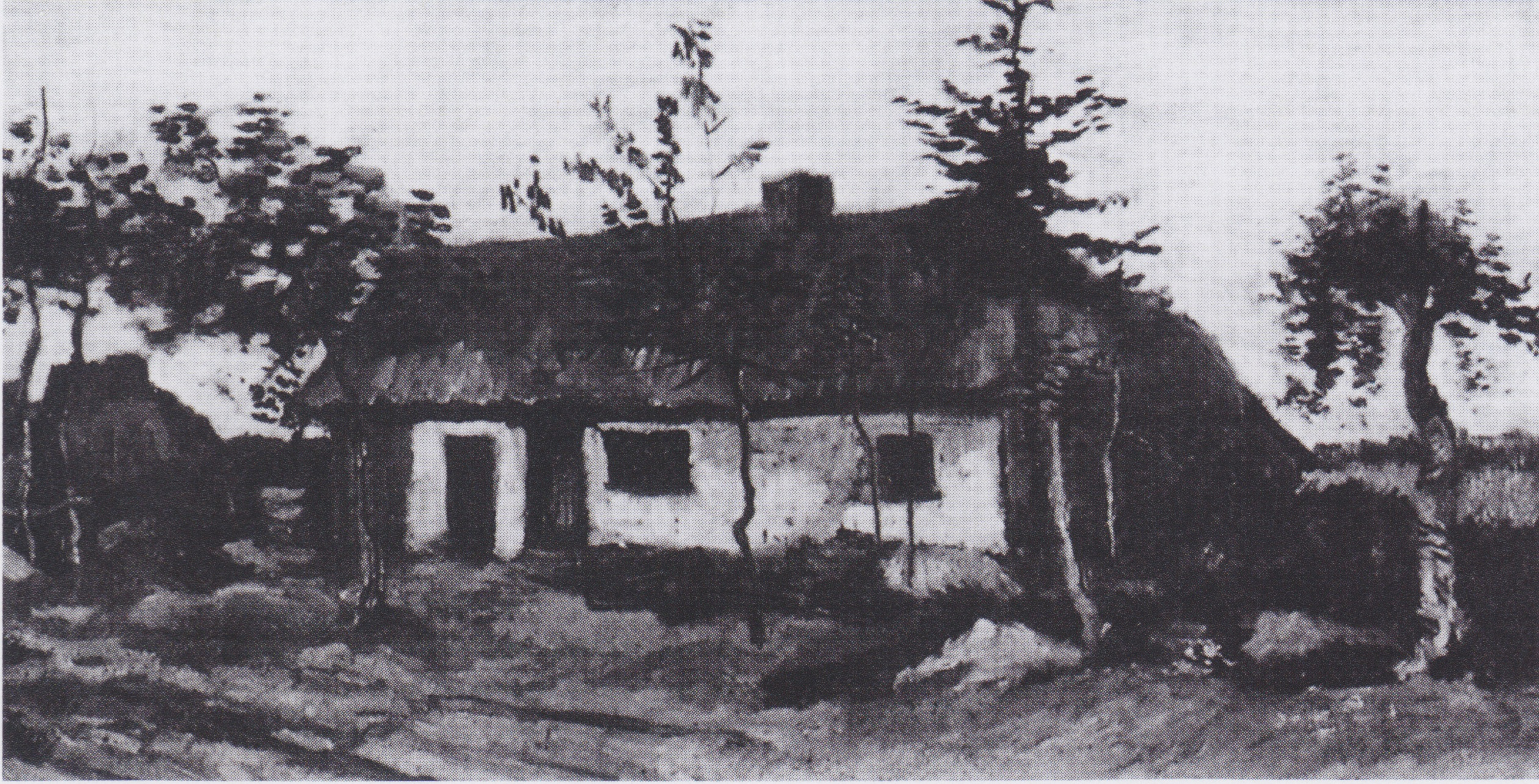
Cottage with Trees also Cottage, June 1885, Private collection (F91)

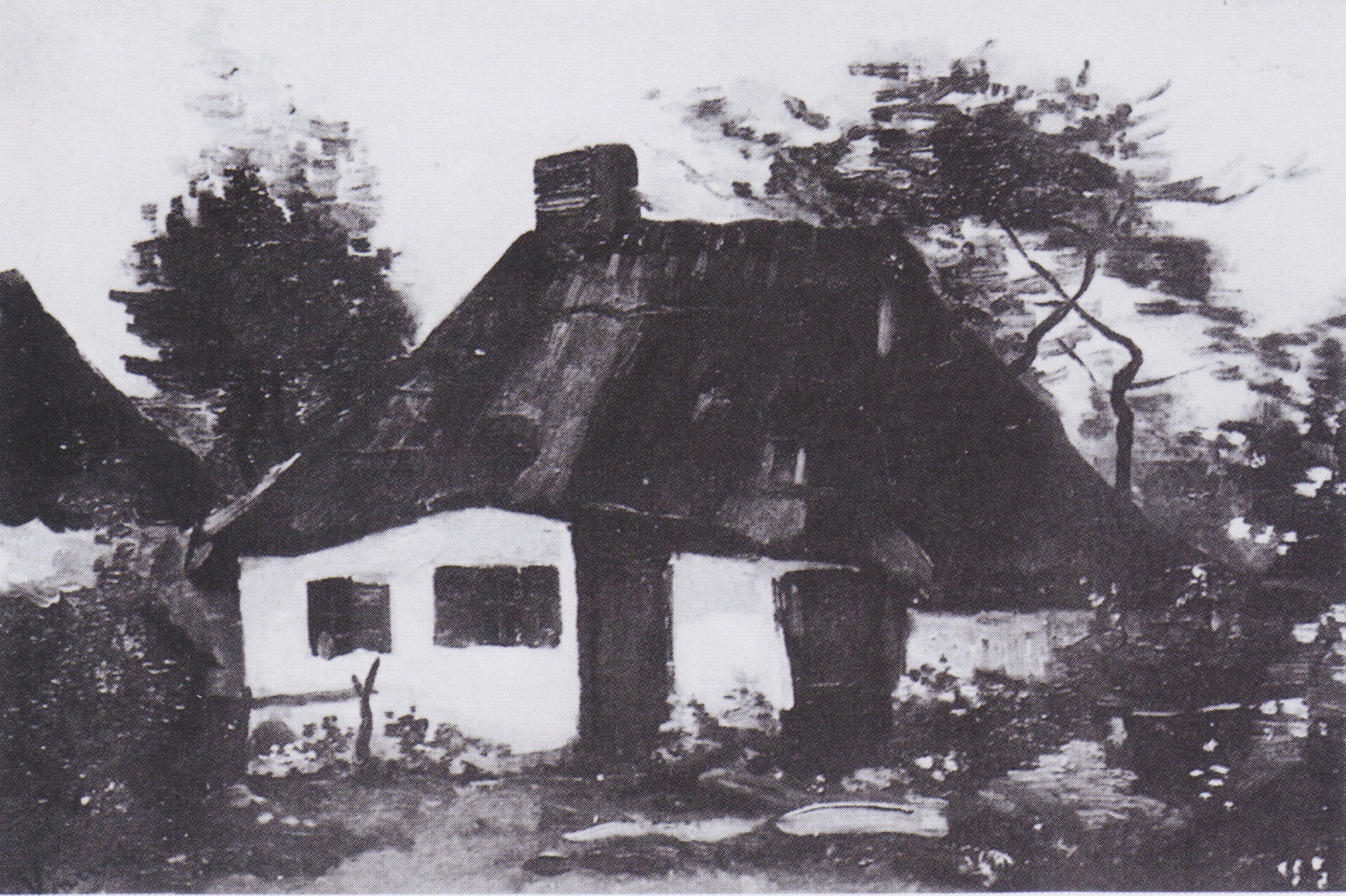
Cottage with Trees, 1885, Private collection (F92)

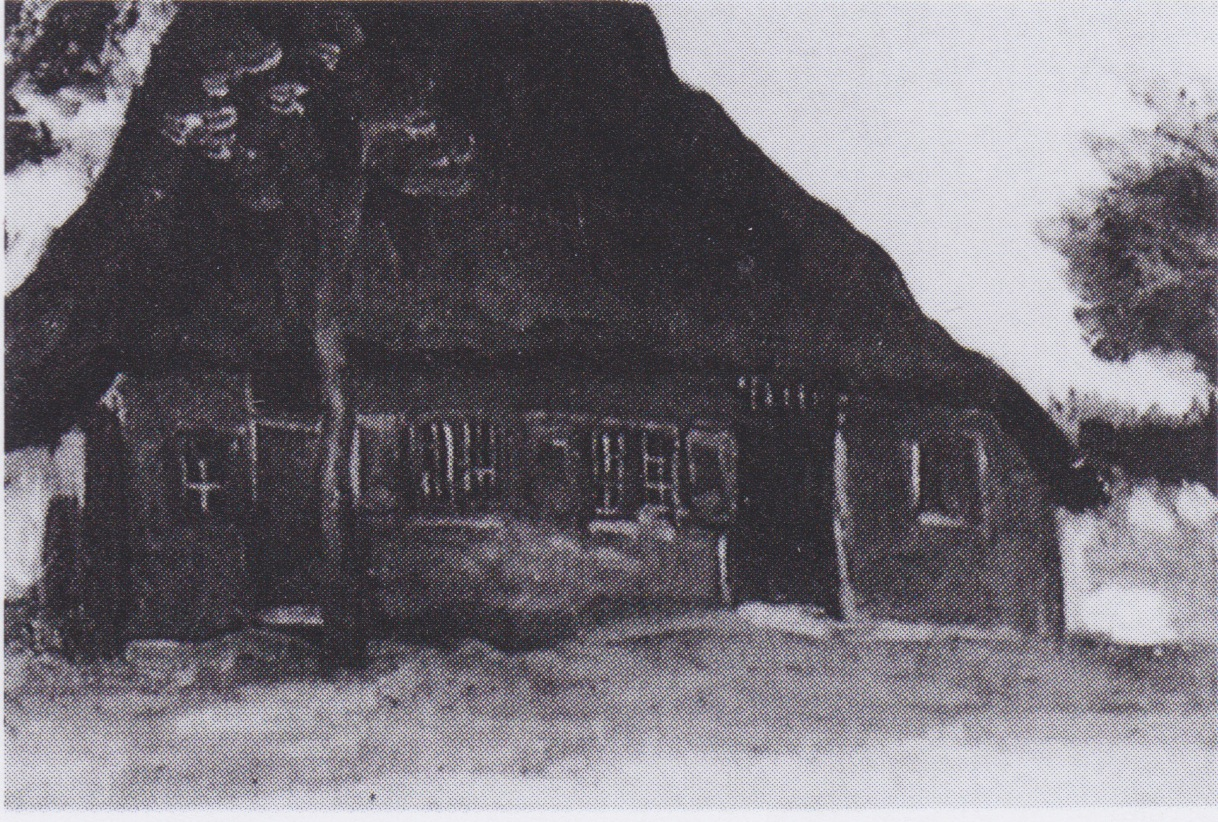
Cottage with Trees, 1885, Private collection (F92a)

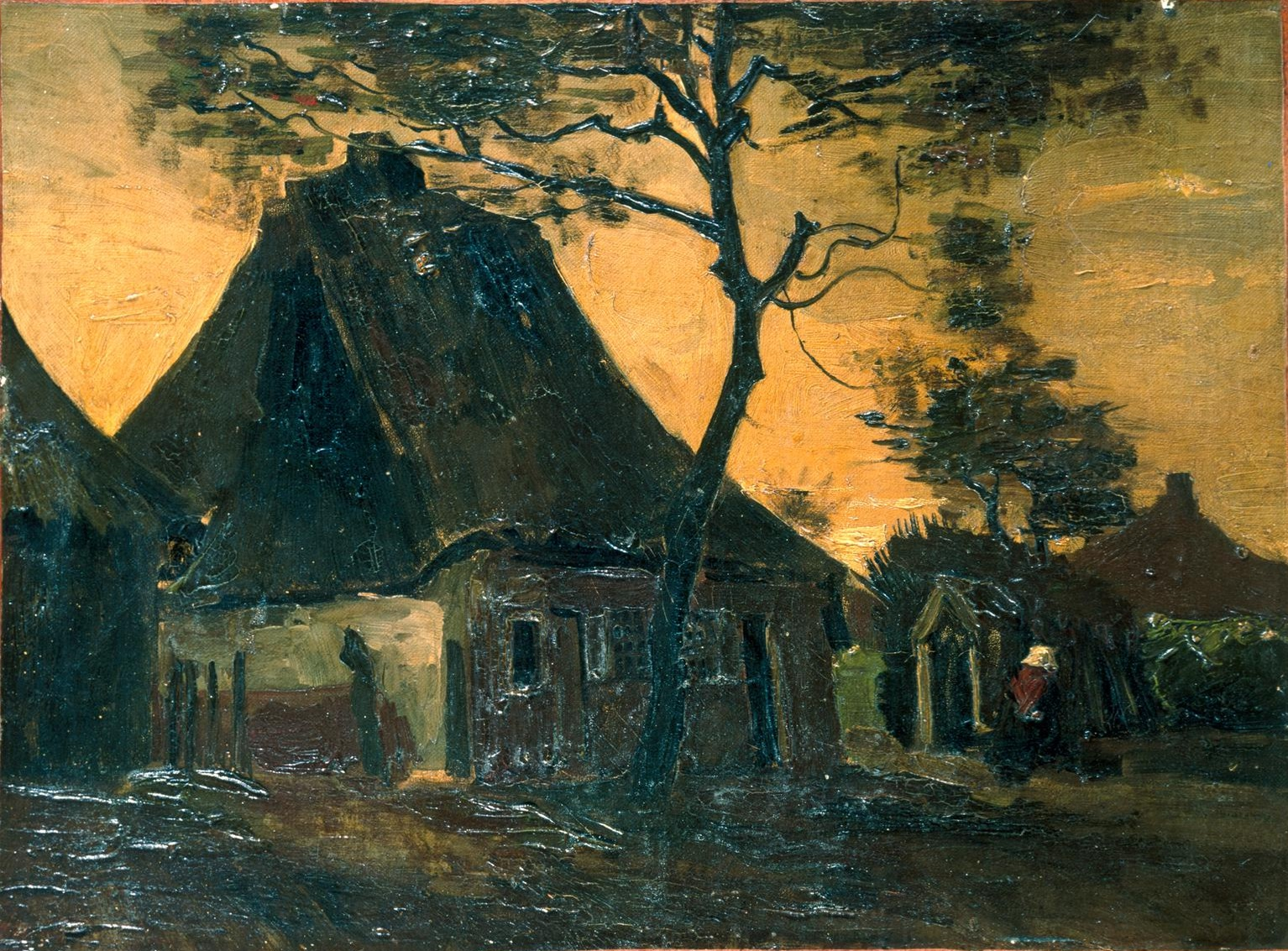
Cottage with Trees, 1885, Wallraf-Richartz Museum, Cologne (F93)

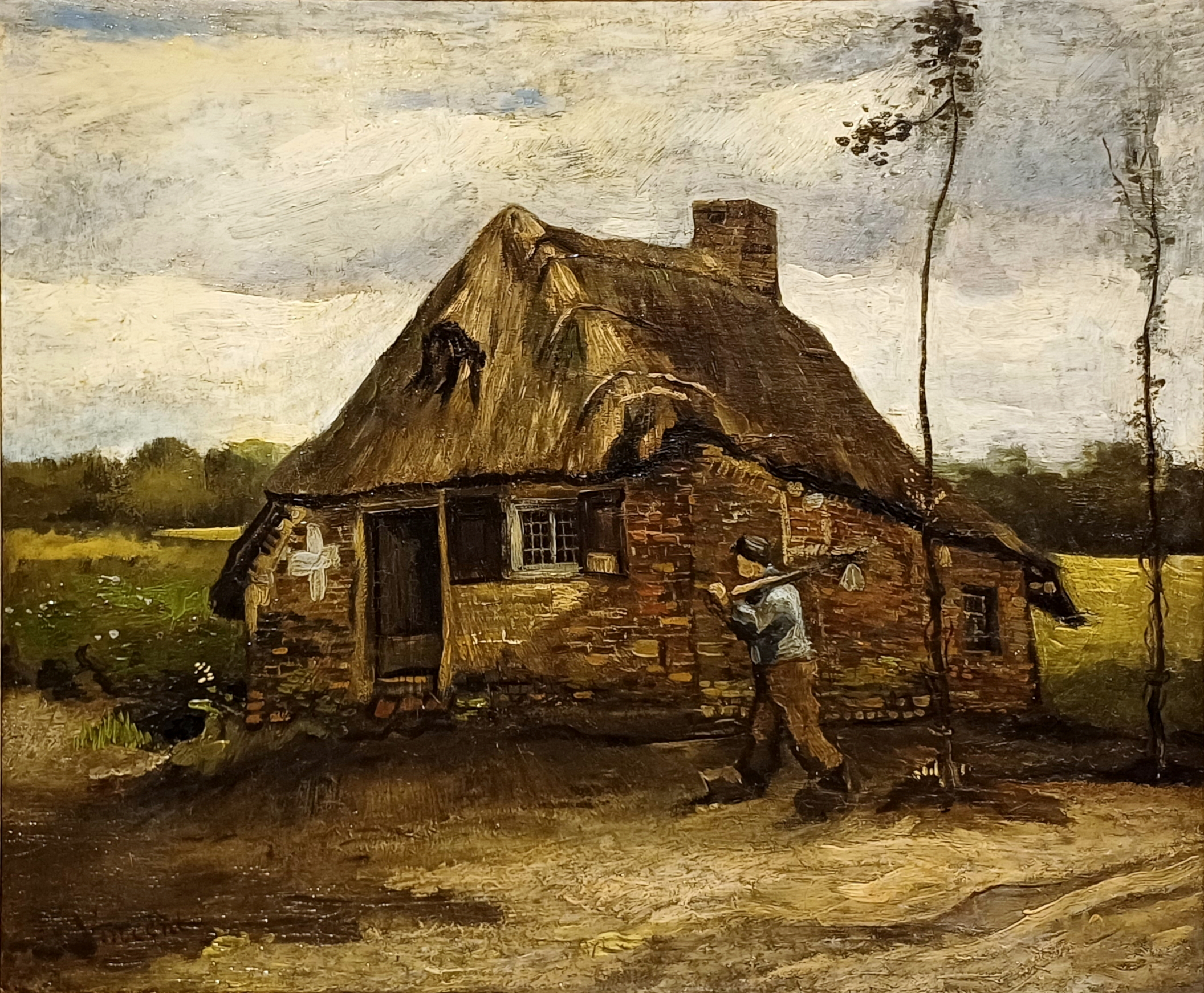
Cottage with Peasant Coming Home, 1885, Museo Soumaya, Mexico City (F170)

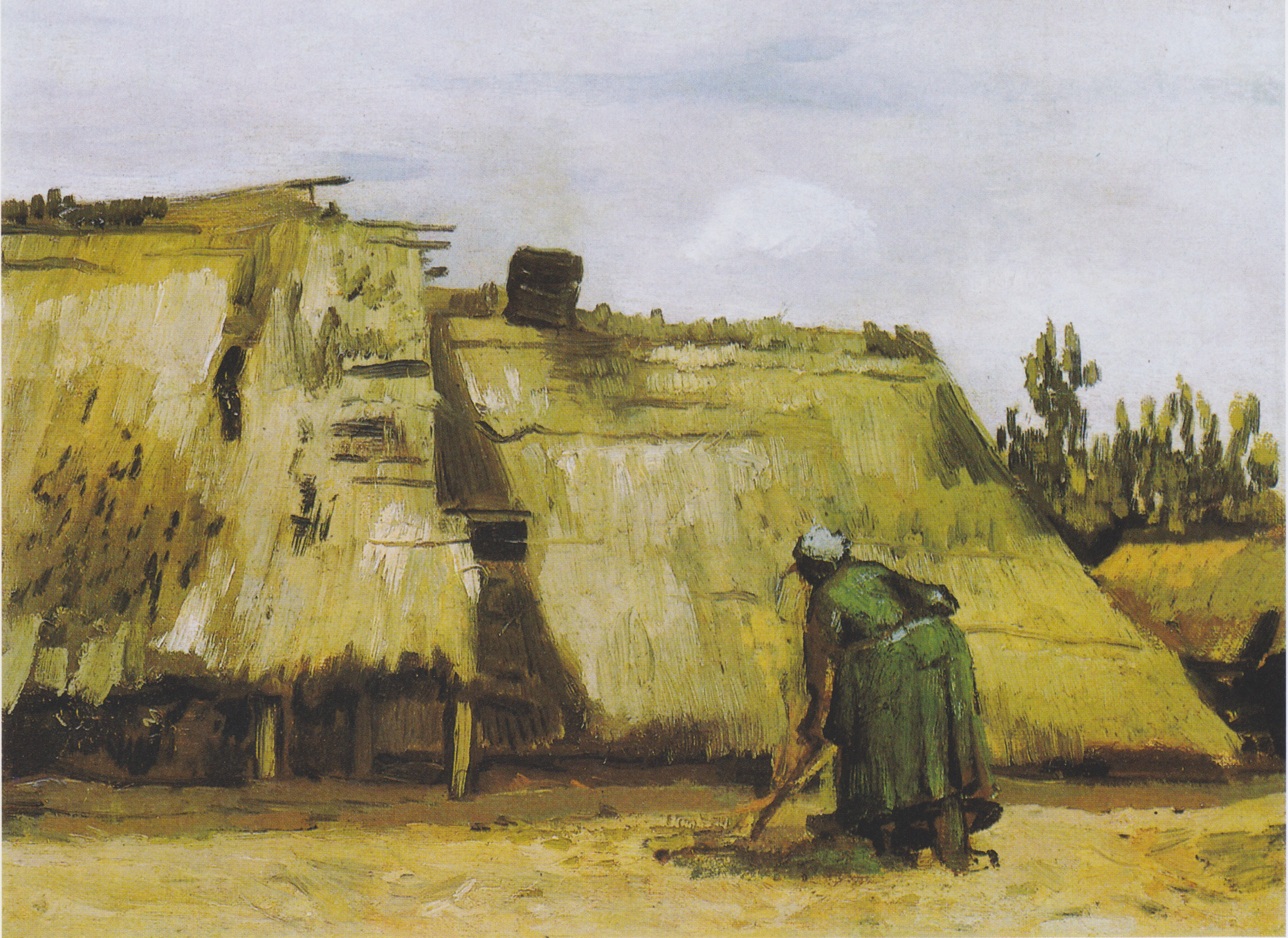
Peasant Woman Digging in Front of Her Cottage, 1885, Art Institute of Chicago (F142)

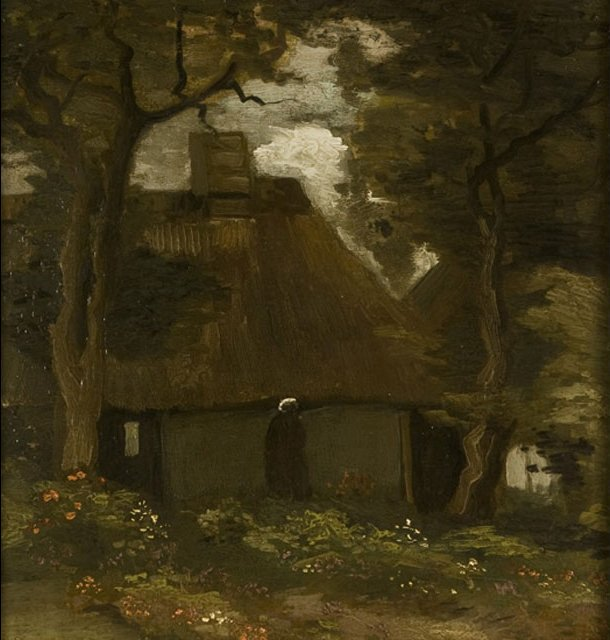
Cottage with Trees and Peasant Woman, 1885, Private collection (F187)

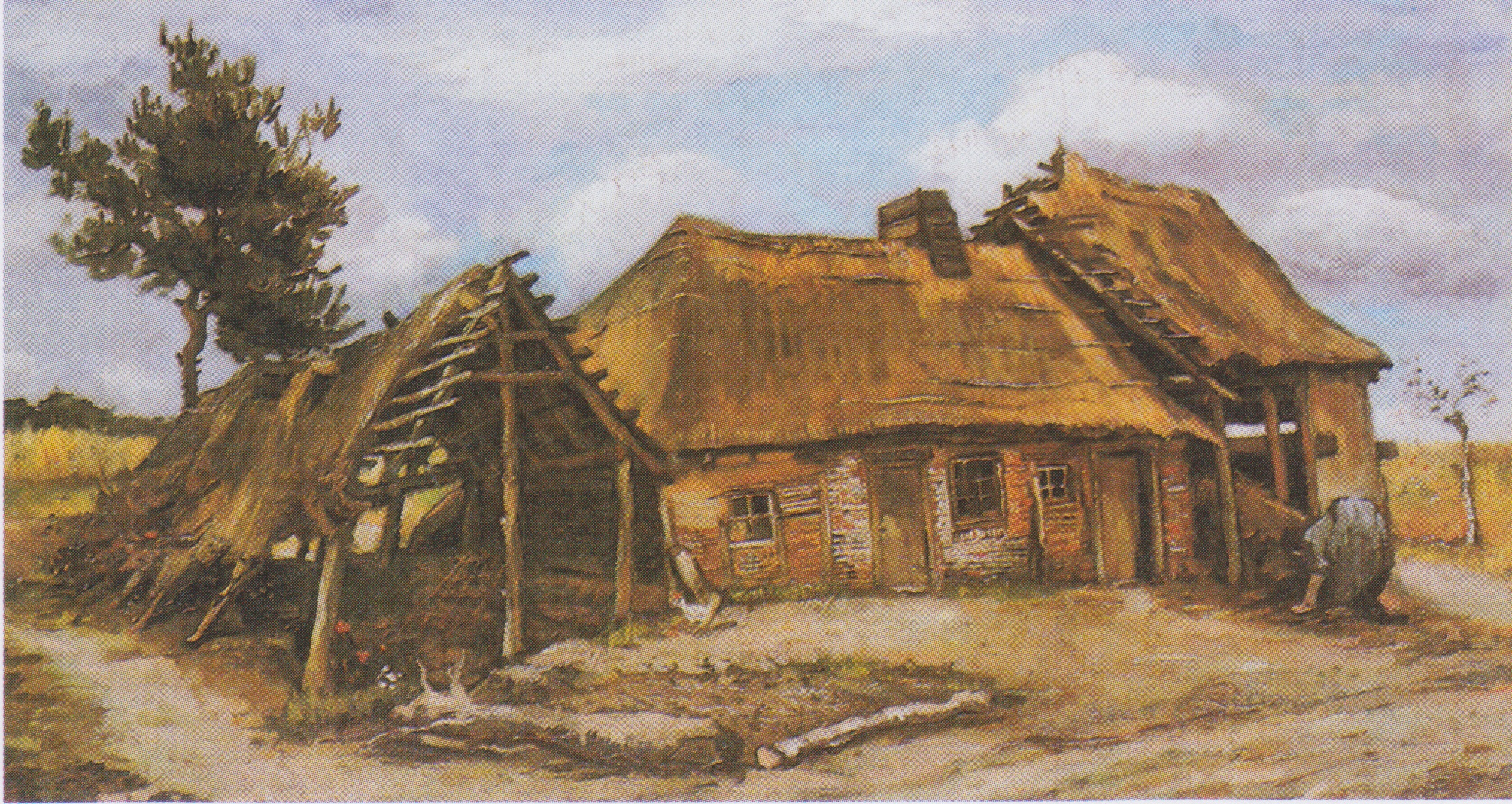
Cottage with Decrepit barn and Stooping Woman, 1885, Private collection (F1669)

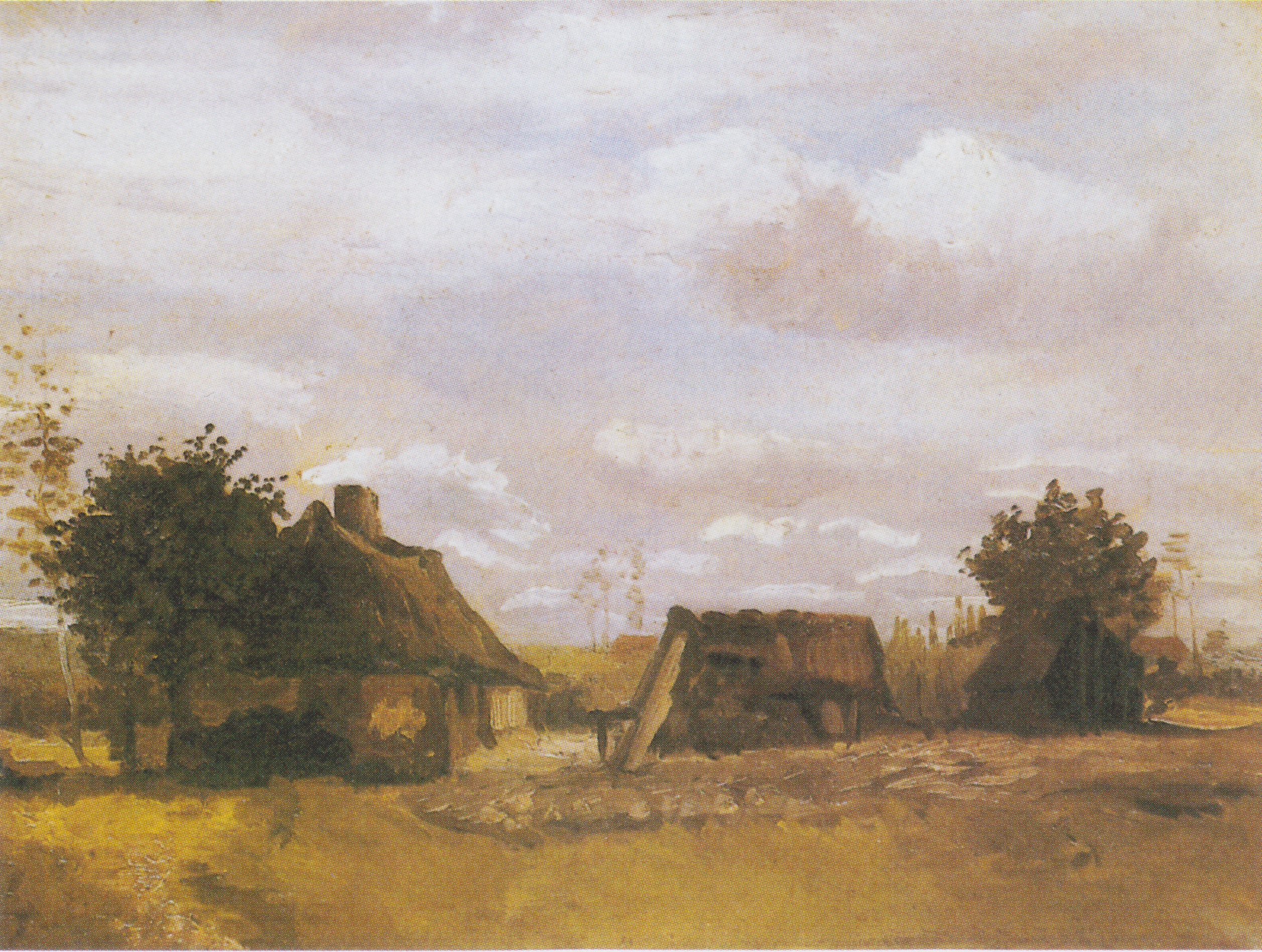
Cottage, June–July 1885, Private collection (No F number, JH Add. 23)

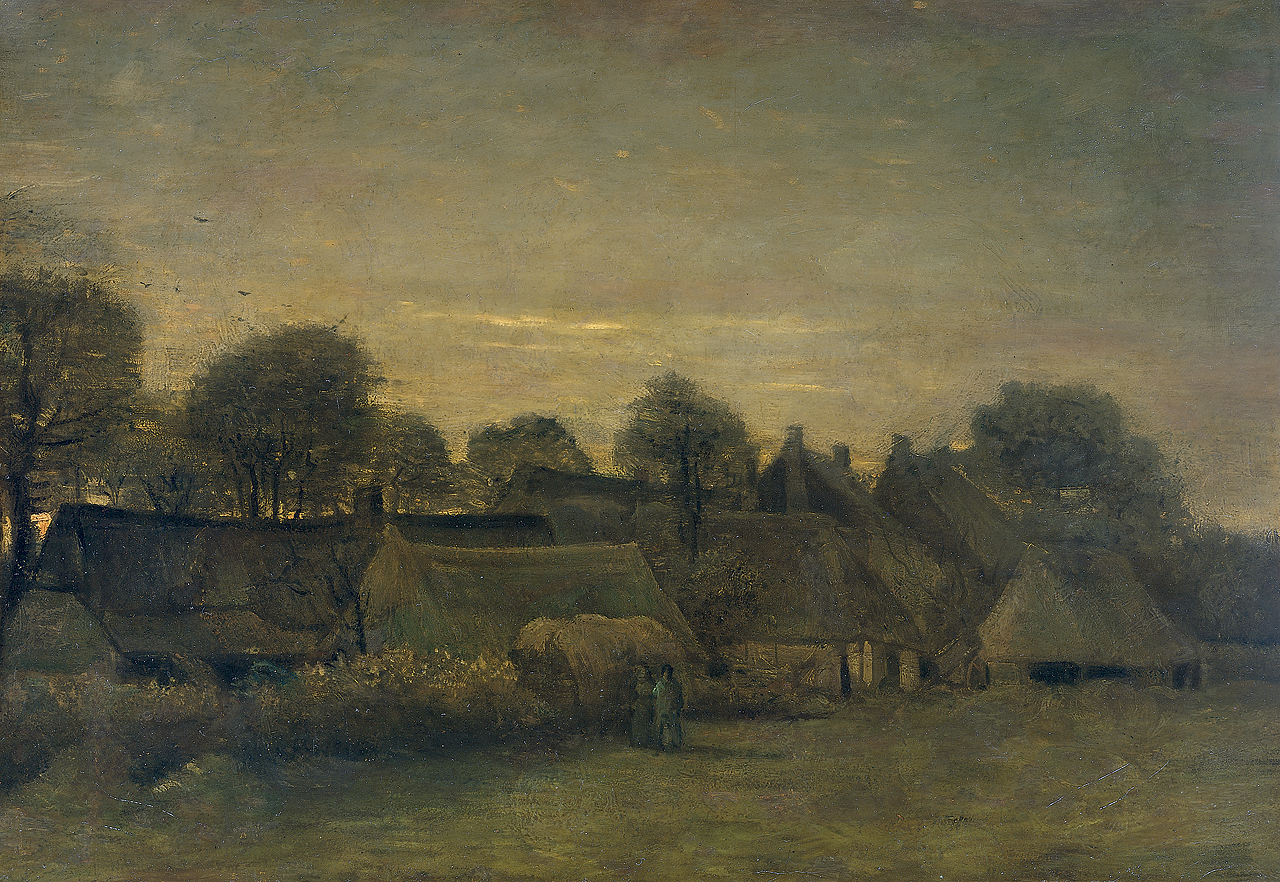
Rural village at night, Rijksmuseum Amsterdam

== See also ==
- Houses at Auvers, a return to the subject of cottages by van Gogh in 1890
- Impressionism
- List of works by Vincent van Gogh
- Post-Impressionism
- Saint-Paul Asylum, Saint-Rémy (Van Gogh series).
- Thatched Cottages and Houses
