= Dos de Abril Department =

- Department
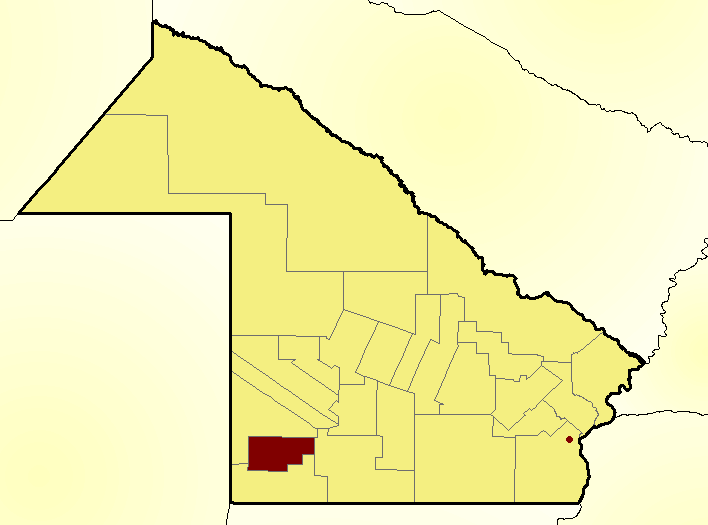
- Location of Dos de Abril Department within Chaco Province
- Coordinates: 27°37′S 61°21′W
- Country: Argentina
- Province: Chaco Province
- Head town: Hermoso Campo

Area
  - Total: 1,594 km^{2} (615 sq mi)

Population
  - Total: 7,435
  - Density: 4.664/km^{2} (12.08/sq mi)
- Time zone: UTC-3 (ART)
- Postal code: H3733
- Area code: 03735

Dos de Abril (April 2) is a south western department of Chaco Province in Argentina.

The provincial subdivision has a population of about 7,500 inhabitants in an area of 1,594 km^{2}, and its capital city is Hermoso Campo, which is located around 1,100 km from the Capital federal.

== Settlements ==
- Hermoso Campo
- Itín
- Zuberbühler
