= Itin =

Itin, itín or ITIN may refer to

- Individual Taxpayer Identification Number, a United States tax processing number
- International Token Identification Number, a unique identifier of tokens build upon Blockchain technology
- Ilya Itin (born 1967), Russian concert pianist
- Vivian Itin (1894–1938), Russian writer
- Itín, Chaco, a village and municipality in northern Argentina
- Prosopis kuntzei, a South American leguminous tree known as itín
- Itin., abbreviation of itinerary or itinerarium
