= Zuberbühler =

Zuberbühler (digraph spelling: Zuberbuehler) is a German surname, a combination of the surnames Zuber and Bühler. Notable people with the surname include:

- Pascal Zuberbühler (born 1971), Swiss football goalkeeper
- David Zuberbühler (born 1979), Swiss businessman and politician
- Nieves Zuberbühler (born 1987), Argentine journalist

== See also ==
- Zuberbühler, Argentina, village in Argentina
- Sebastian Zouberbuhler (c. 1710–1773), merchant and politician in Nova Scotia
- Fritz Zuber-Buhler (1822–) was a Swiss painter
