= Hermoso Campo =

- Town
- Location of Hermoso Campo in Argentina
- Coordinates: 27°37′S 61°21′W
- Country: Argentina
- Province: Chaco
- Department: Dos de Abril
- Elevation: 63 m (207 ft)

Population
  - Total: 4,402
- Time zone: UTC−3 (ART)
- CPA base: H3733
- Dialing code: +54 3735

Hermoso Campo is a town in Chaco Province, Argentina. It is the head town of the Dos de Abril Department.

== Economy ==
The local economy is mainly based around the production of soya, maize and cotton.
