= Zuberbühler, Argentina =

Coordinates: 27°43′S 61°22′W

Zuberbühler
- Municipality and village
- Interactive map of Zuberbühler
- Country: Argentina
- Province: Chaco Province
- Time zone: UTC−3 (ART)

Zuberbühler is a village and municipality in Chaco Province in northern Argentina.

== Education ==
Zuberbühler has a primary level school.

== Communication channels ==
Although Zuberbühler is on Provincial Route 15, the main communication route is Provincial Route 5, since it is paved and only 6 km (3.7 miles) away.

== See also ==
- Pascal Zuberbühler, Swiss athlete
- Nieves Zuberbühler, Argentine journalist
