= Itín, Chaco =

Coordinates: 27°29′S 61°19′W

Itín (Chaco)
- Municipality and village
- Interactive map of Itín (Chaco)
- Country: Argentina
- Province: Chaco Province
- Department: Dos de Abril
- Elevation: 289 ft (88 m)

Population (2010)
  - Total: 441
- Time zone: UTC−3 (ART)

Itín is a village and municipality in Chaco Province in northern Argentina.
