= Fritz Zuber-Buhler =

Swiss painter (1822–1896)

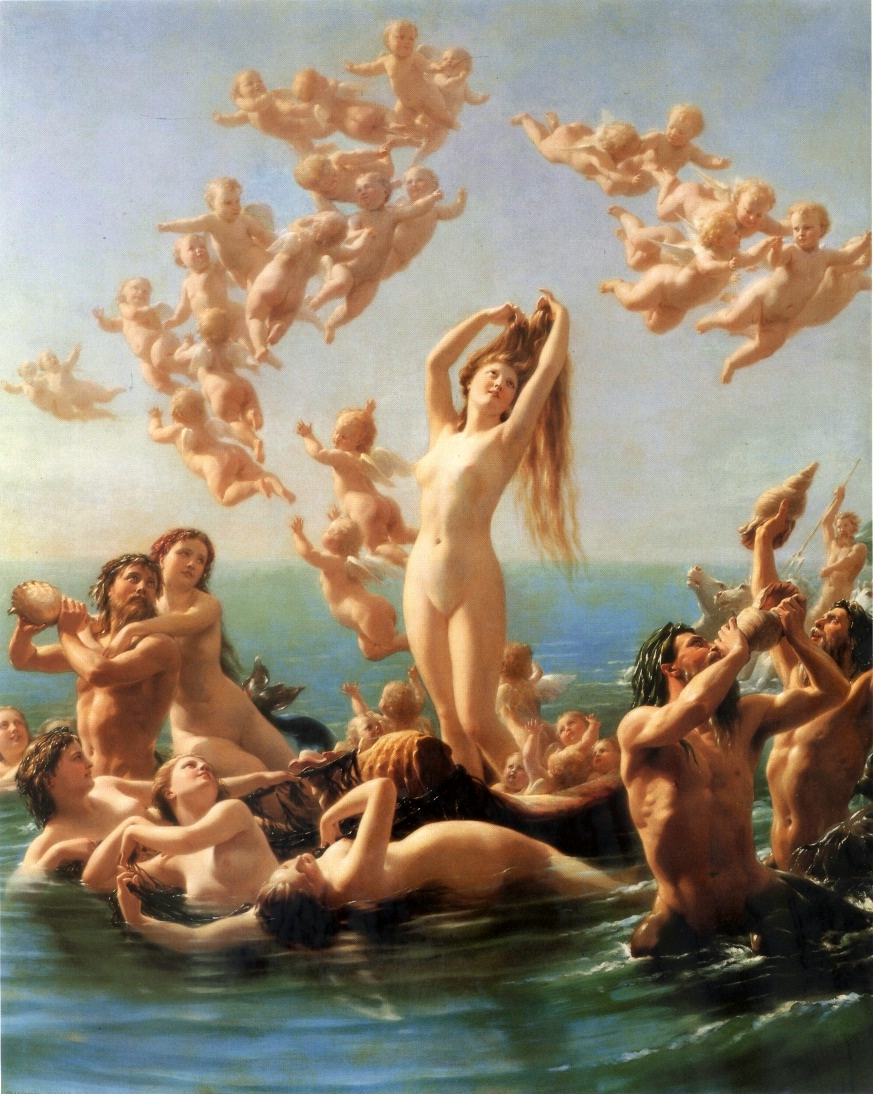
Birth of Venus, by Fritz Zuber-Buhler, Porczyński Gallery in Warsaw

Fritz Zuber-Buhler (1822 – November 23, 1896) was a Swiss painter in the style of Academic Classicism, born at Le Locle in Switzerland.

== Biography ==
At sixteen years of age he moved to Paris, France where found his first teacher, Louis Grosclaude. Later he studied at the École des Beaux-Arts and then refined his technical skills with François-Édouard Picot, who followed the same lineage of contemporaneous artists such as Léon Perrault, Bouguereau, and Alexandre Cabanel. Afterwards he spent some time in Italy searching for inspiration; he may have also studied in Berlin. After five years abroad, he returned to Paris, where he made his debut at the Salon of 1850. In subsequent Salons he showed works in many media: oil paintings, drawings, pastels and watercolors.

His painting Innocence shows his romantic view of the peasant children and their environment. He painted mythological and religious subjects, as well as commissioned portraits. Zuber-Buhler exhibited in the United States at the Pennsylvania Academy of the Fine Arts and achieved considerable success. He exhibited at the Salon (Paris) until 1891, by which time the European academic tradition he represented was past its heyday.

== Works ==
- A reclining beauty
- Birth of Venus
- Children with kitten
- Dressing up
- Dust returns to dust and the Spirit rises up to the God who gave it
- Girl with wreath
- Idyll in deep forest
- Innocence
- Madame Marquise
- Marie Heilbron
- Maternity
- Young girl
- Spirit of the Morning
- The cherry thieves
- The childhood of Bacchus
- The Dew
- The first cherries
- The Gypsy
- The Lesson
- The Madonna and the child Jesus
- The pet kitten
- The third Thursday in Lent
- Tickling the baby
- Young beauty holding a bouquet of flowers
- Young girl holding a doll
- Young girl with a curly dog
- Young girl with a bouquet of flowers

== Gallery ==
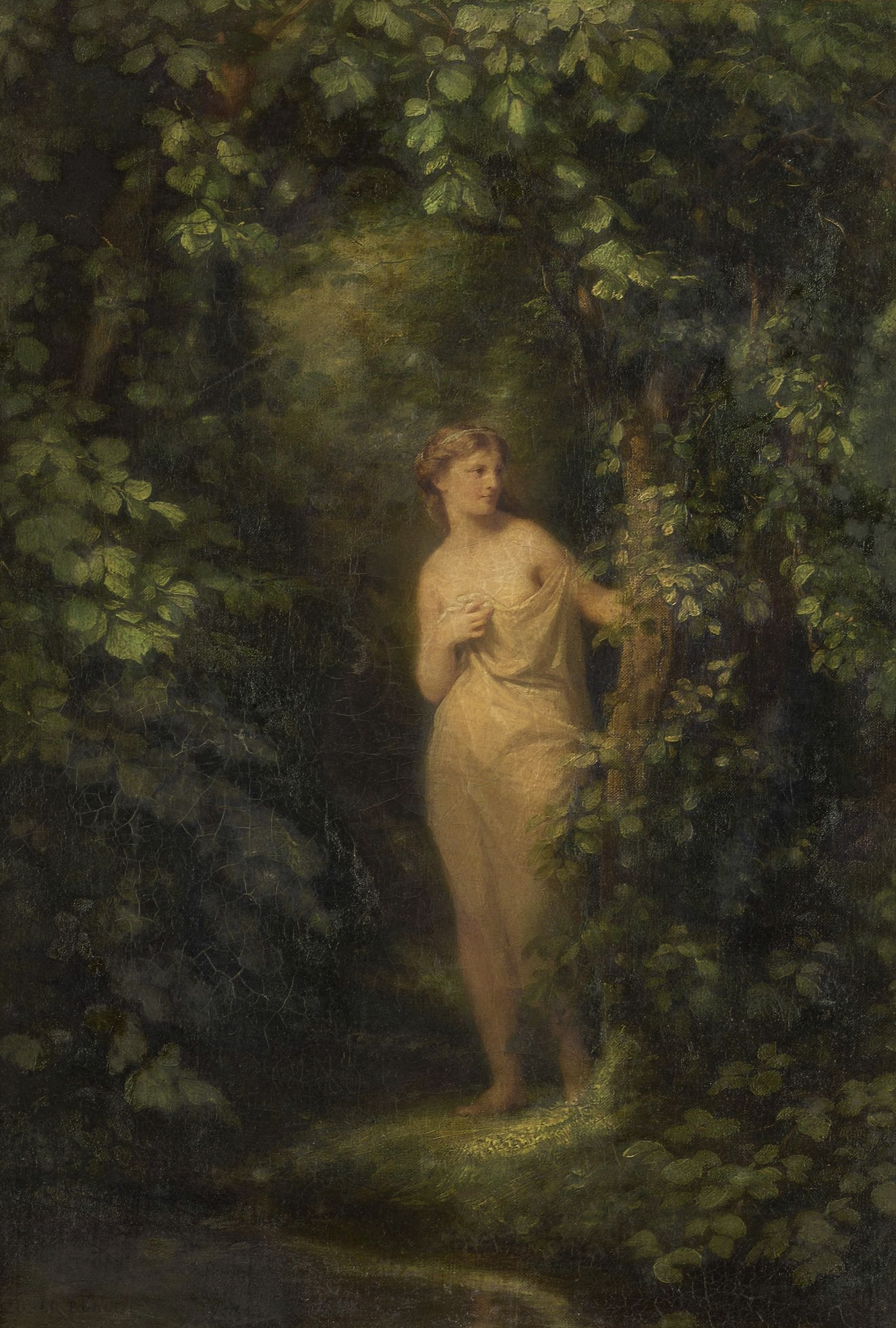
Nymph in the forest

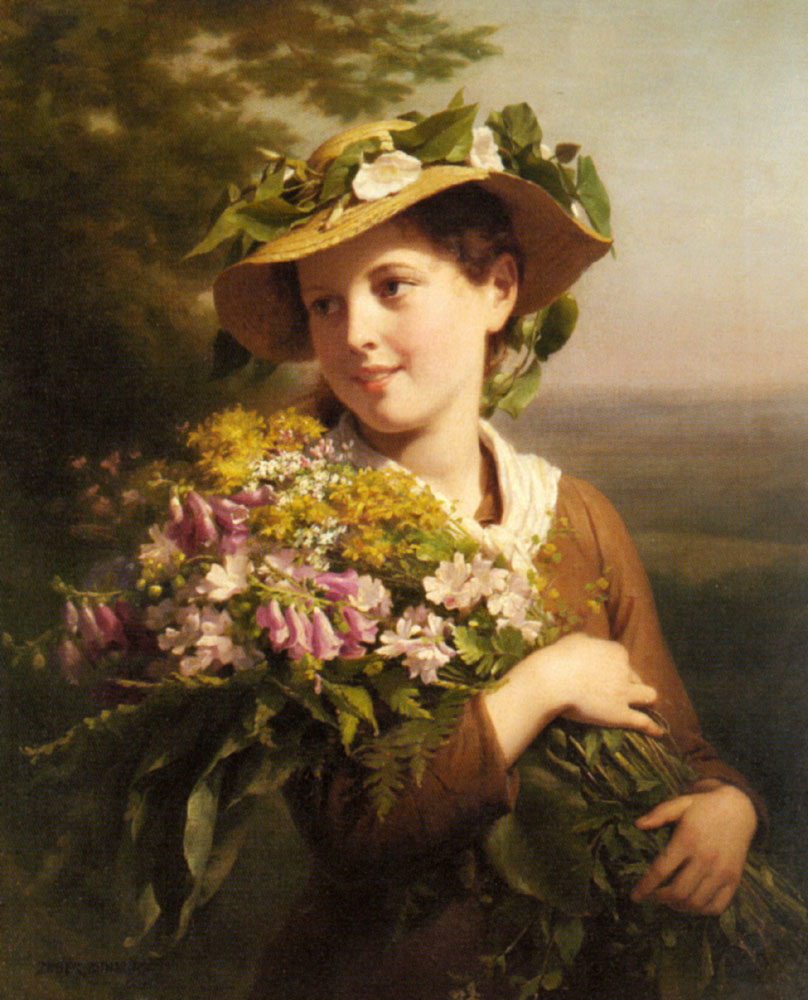
A young beauty holding a bouquet of flowers

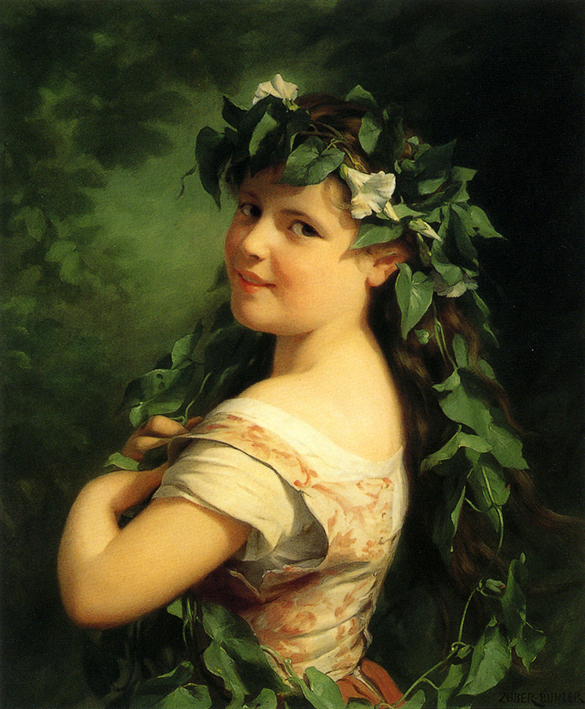
Girl with wreath

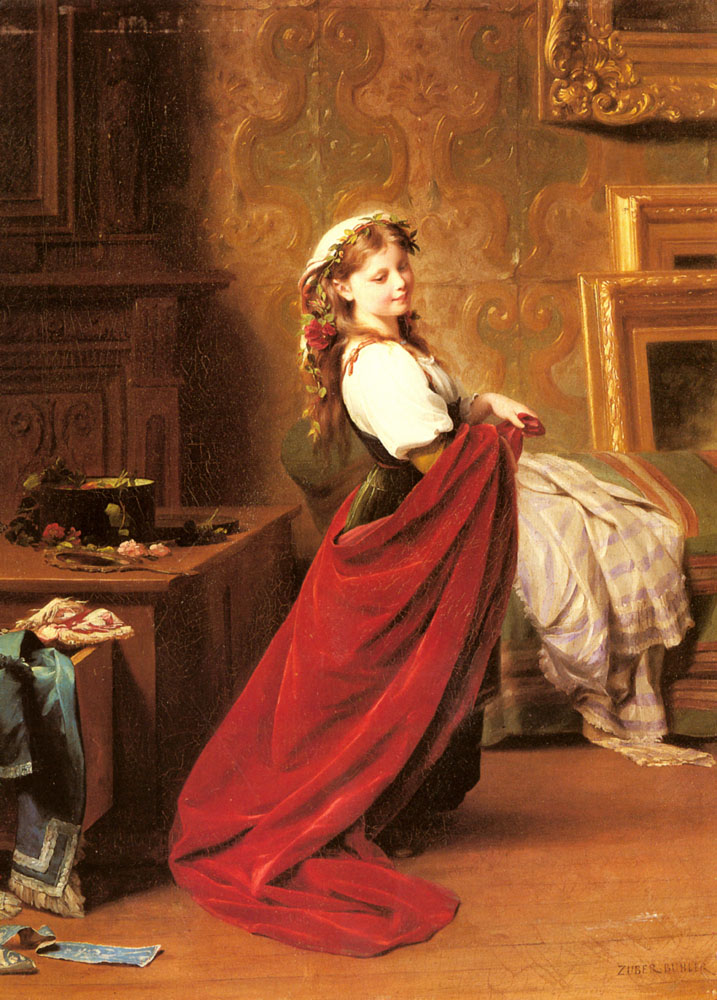
Dressing up

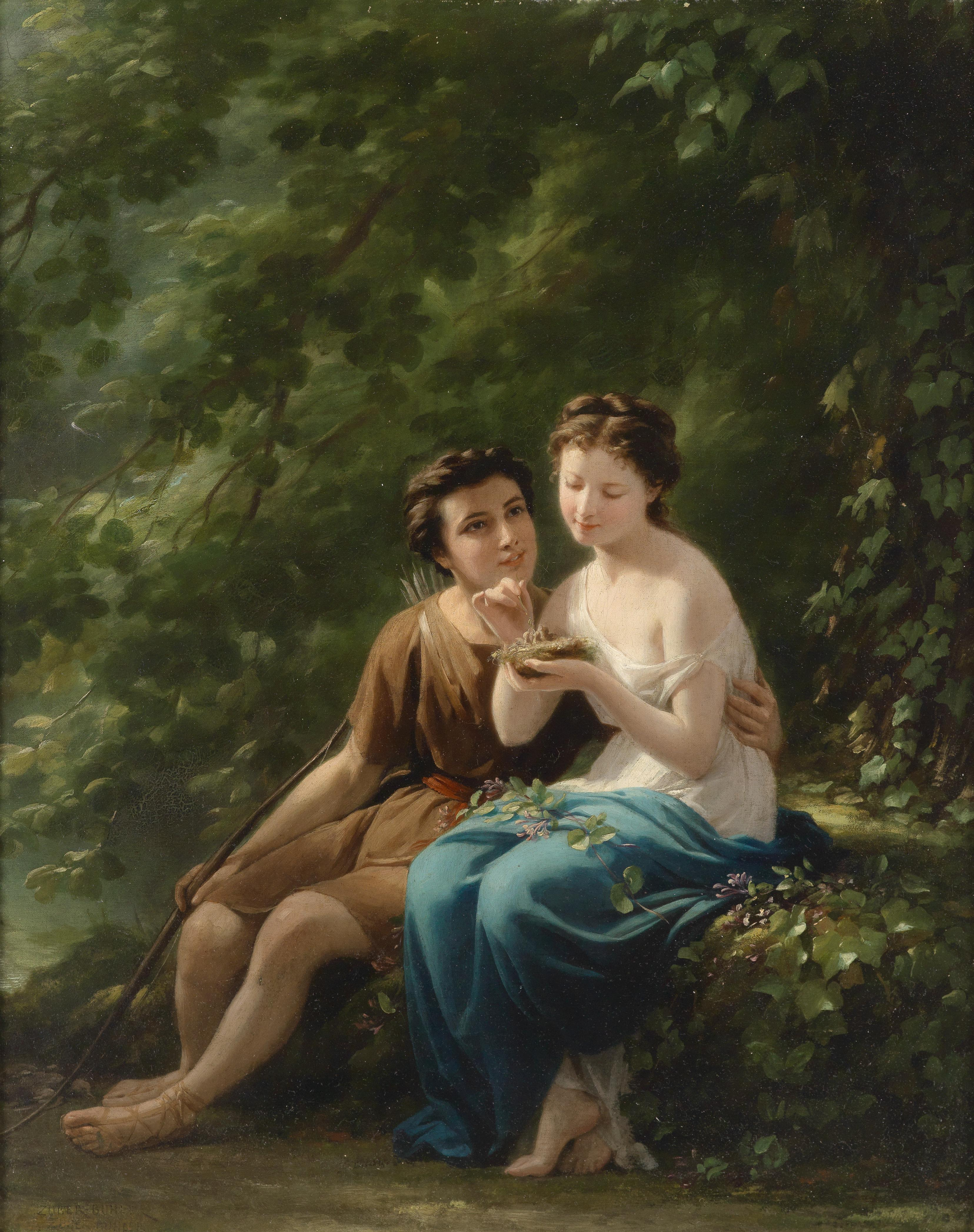
Idyll in deep forest

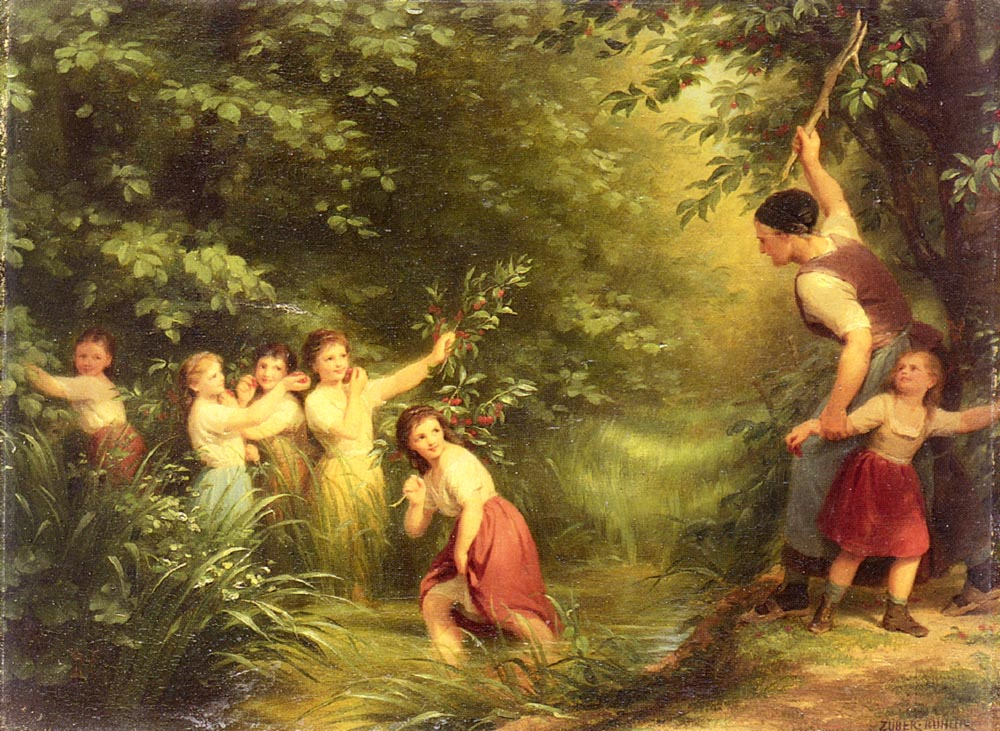
The cherry thieves

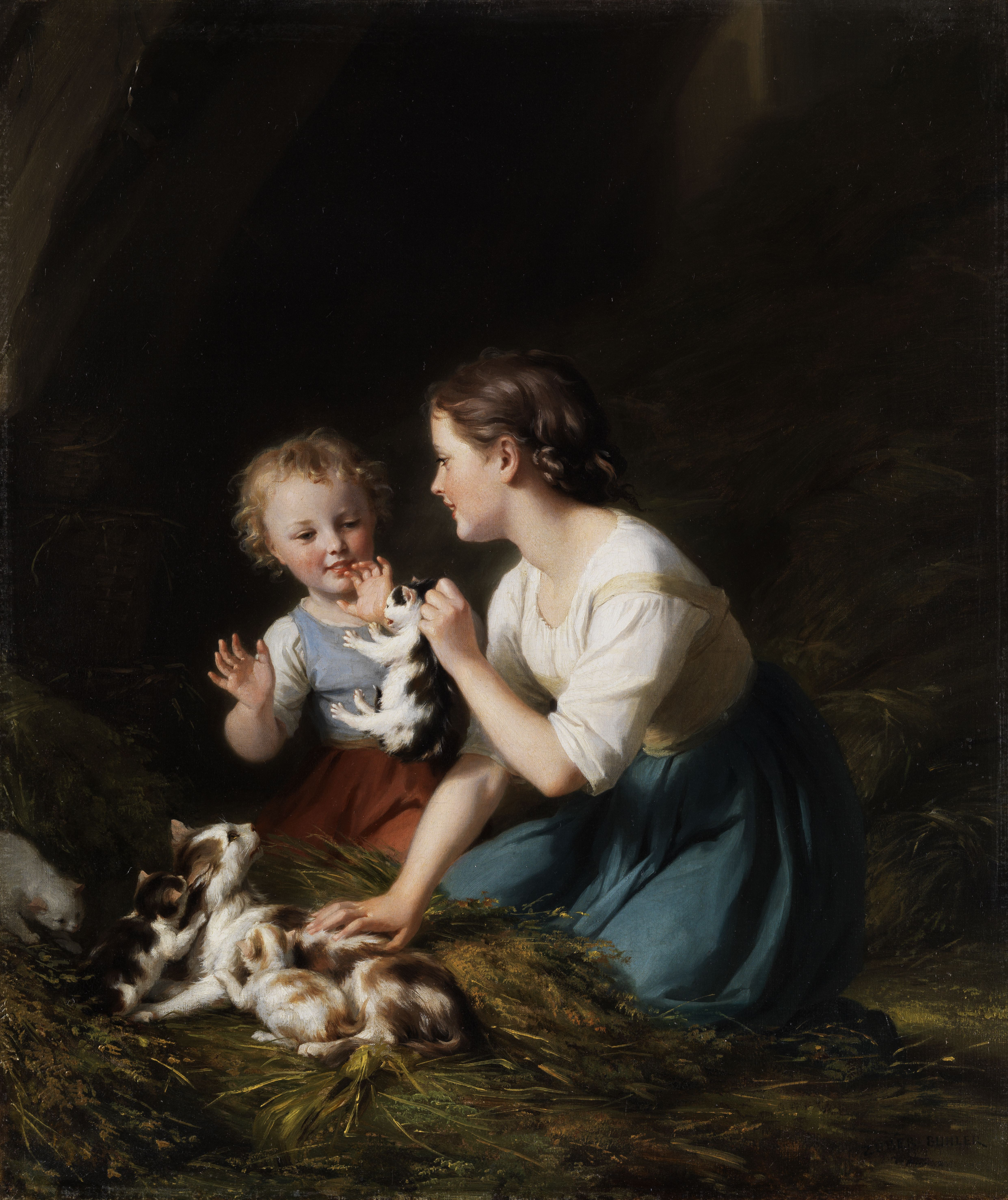
The pet kitten

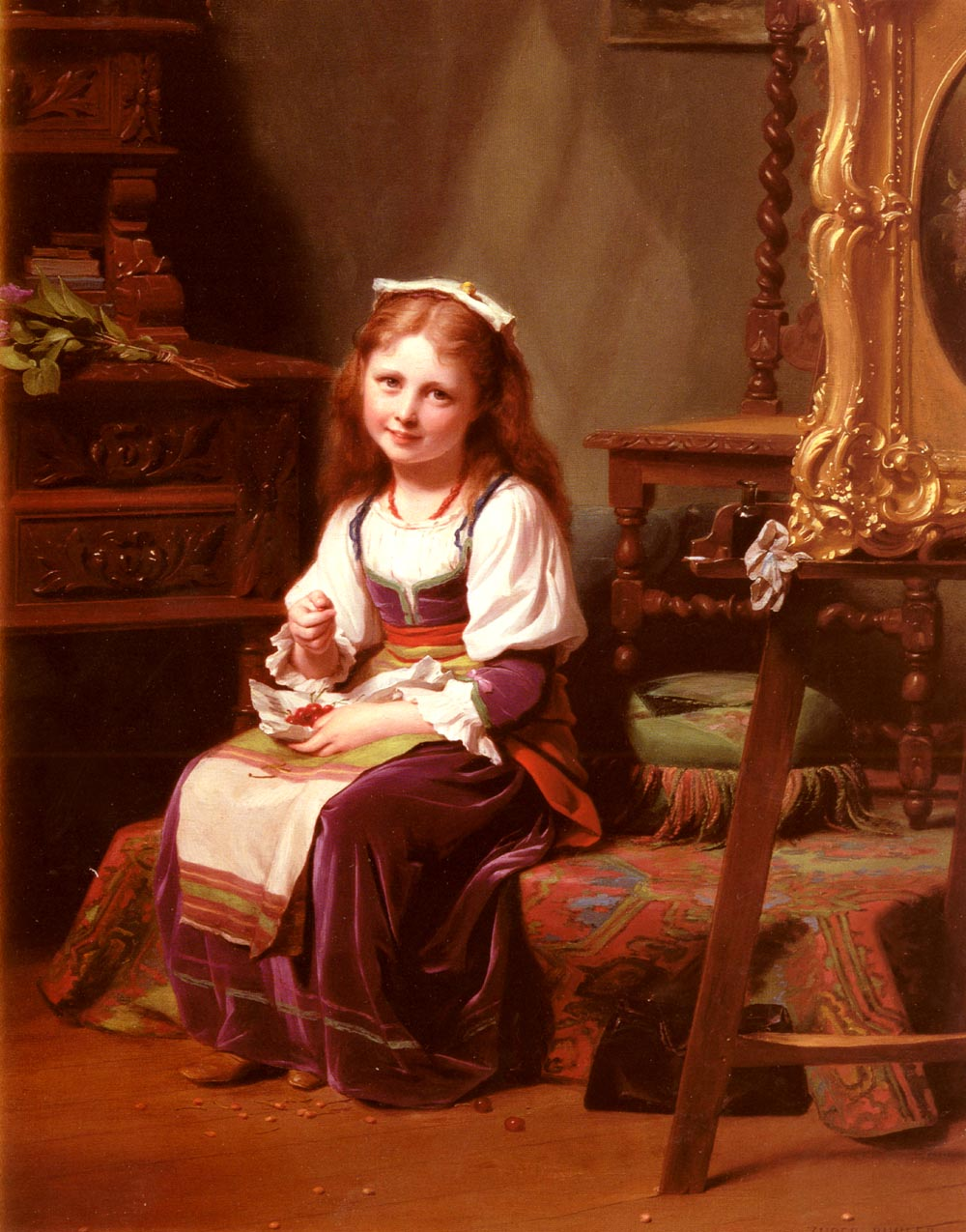
The first cherries

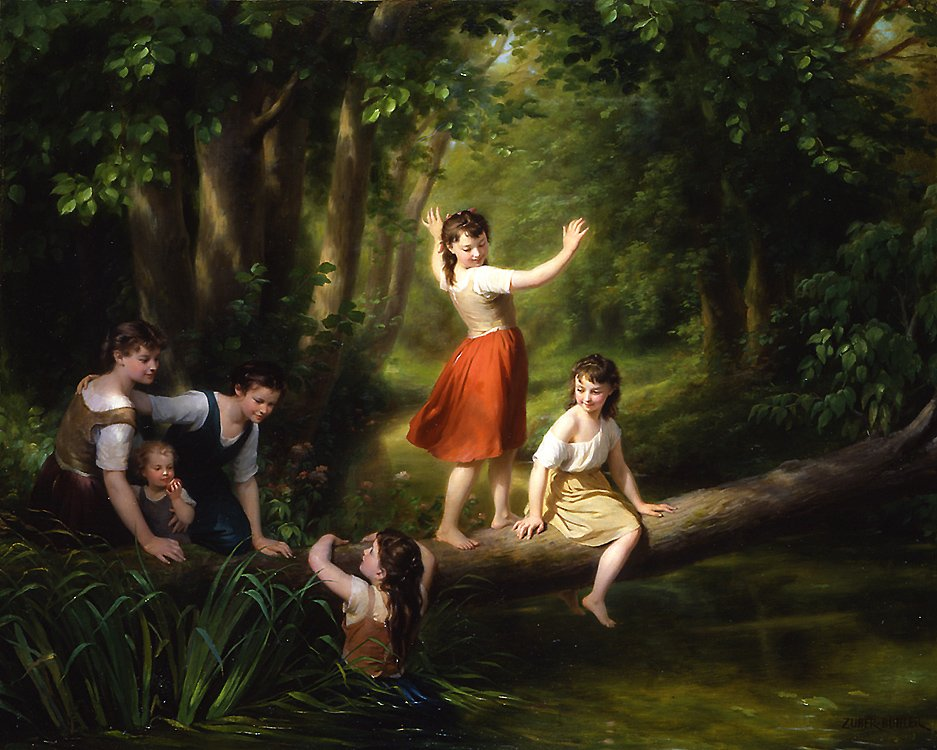
Innocence

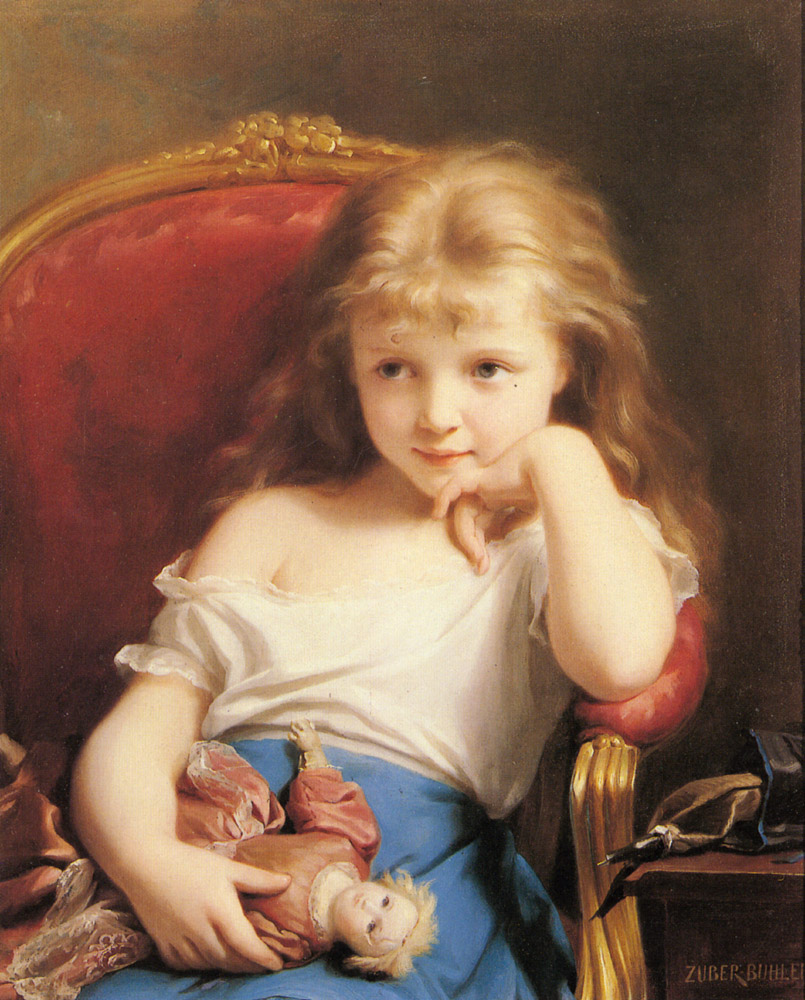
Young girl holding a doll
