= Farmhouses Among Trees =

Painting by Vincent van Gogh

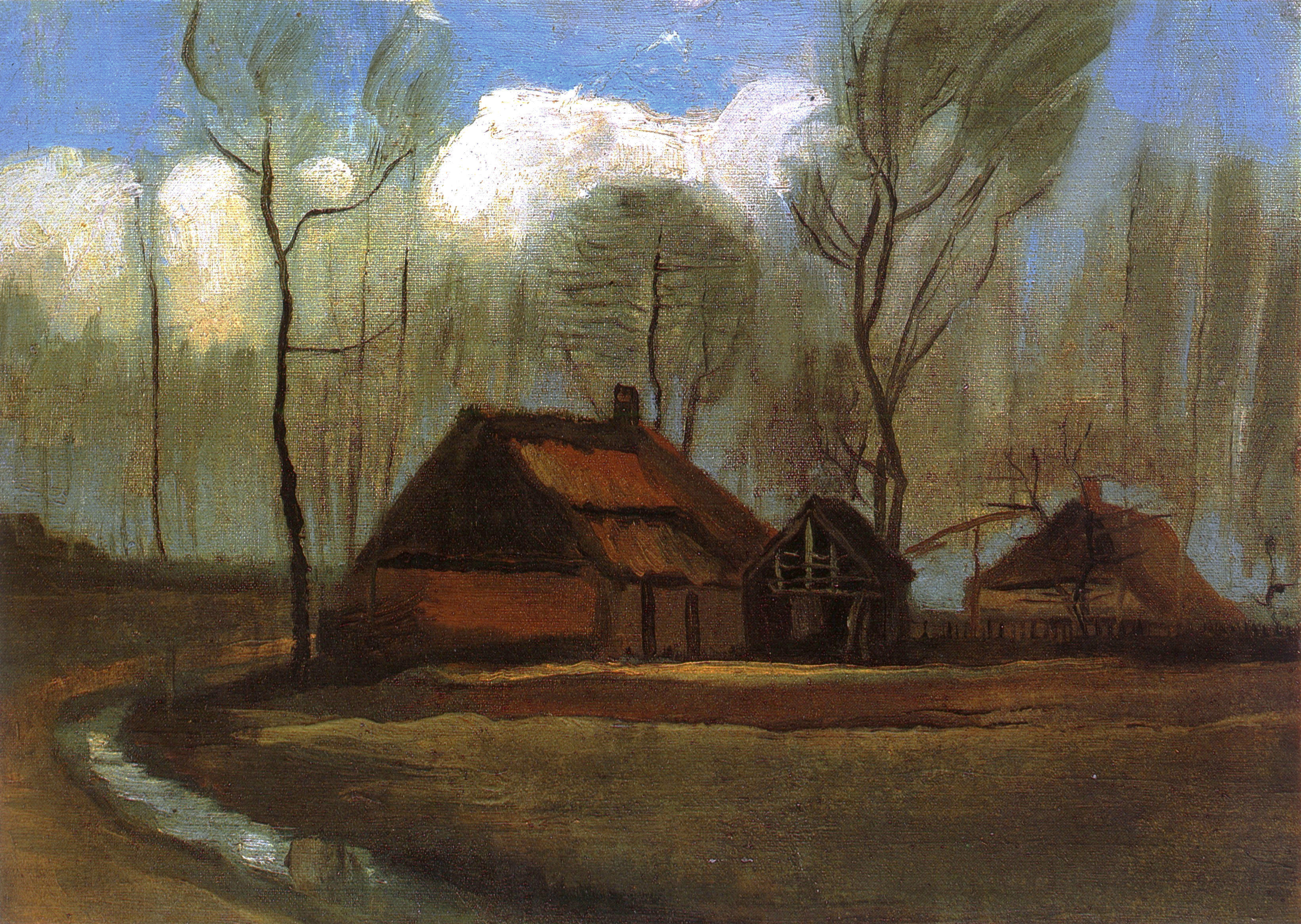
- Artist: Vincent van Gogh
- Year: 1883
- Catalogue: F18; JH397
- Medium: Oil on canvas
- Dimensions: 28.5 cm × 39.5 cm (11.2 in × 15.6 in)
- Location: Porczyński Gallery, Warsaw

Farmhouses Among Trees is an oil painting created by Dutch artist Vincent van Gogh in September 1883.

The painting is exhibited in the Museum of John Paul II Collection in Warsaw. In 2024, the authenticity of the painting was confirmed beyond all doubt after analyses by experts from the National Museum in Kraków and Van Gogh Museum.

== See also ==
- List of works by Vincent van Gogh
