= Museum of John Paul II Collection =

Art museum in Warsaw, Poland

Coordinates: 52°14′32″N 21°0′08″E

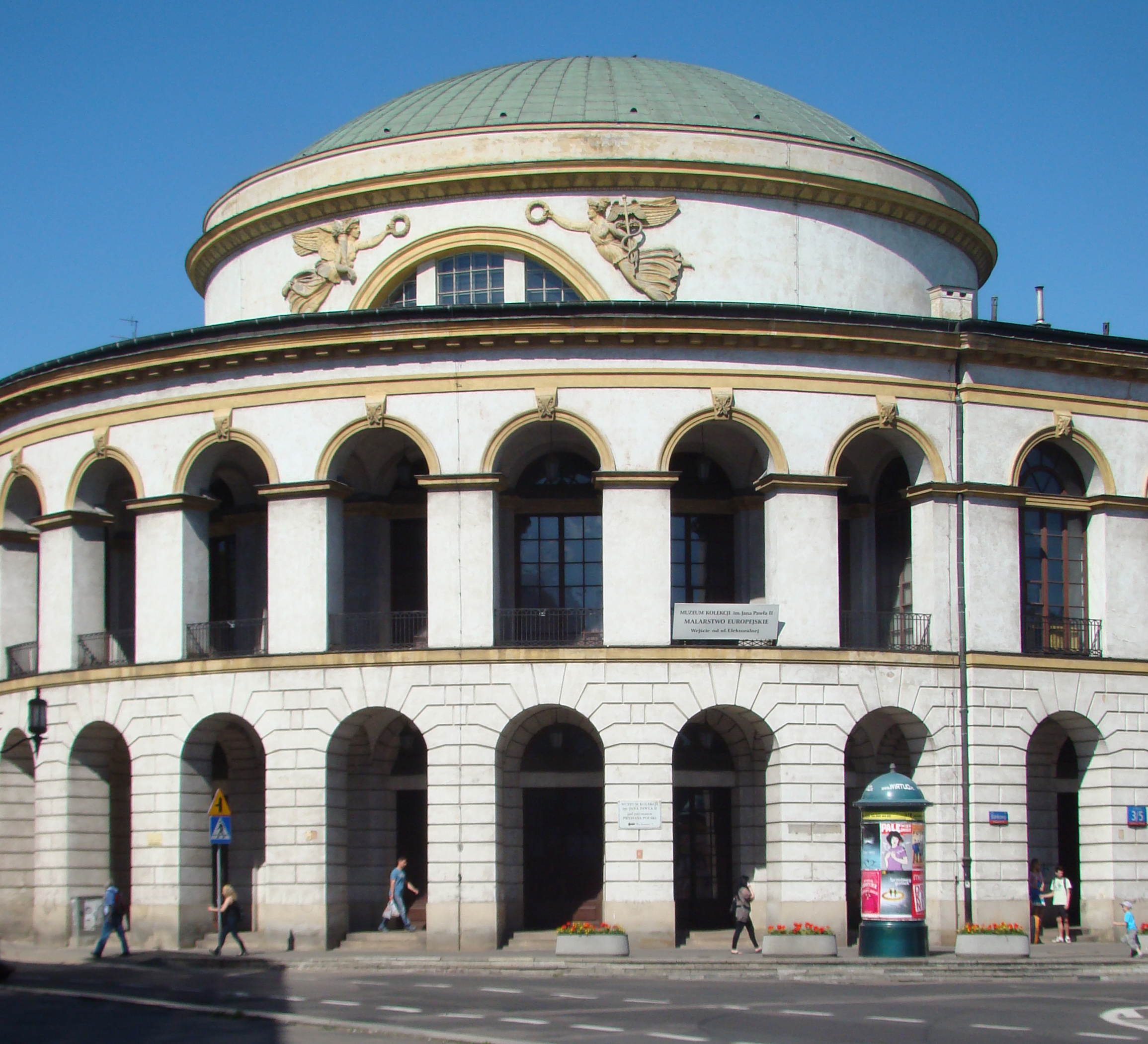
- Building of the former stock exchange

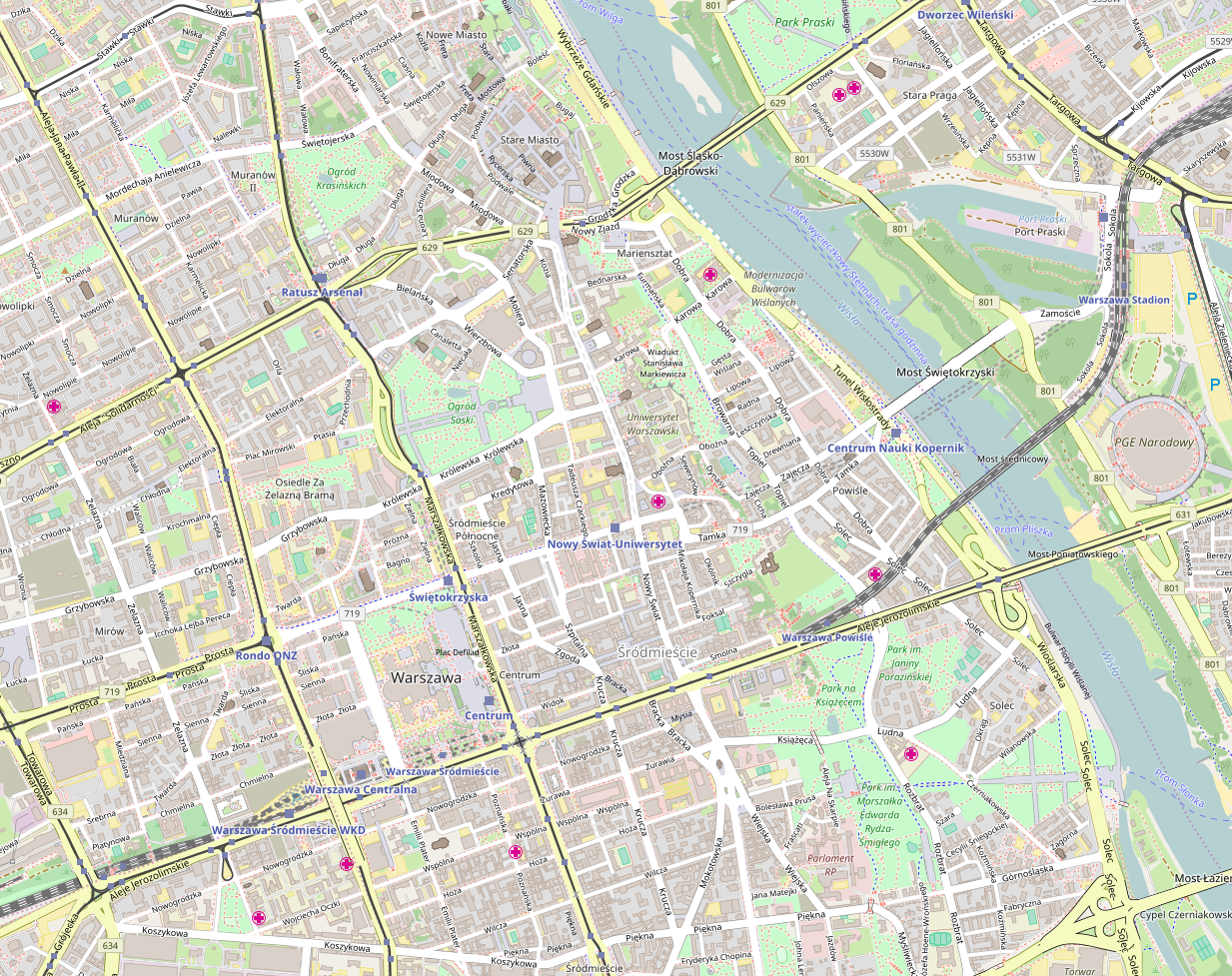
- Location within the city of Warsaw
- Established: 1989
- Location: 1 Bank Square; Warsaw, Poland
- Public transit access: Ratusz Arsenal
- Website: mkjp2.pl

The Museum of John Paul II Collection (Polish: Muzeum Kolekcji im. Jana Pawła II) in Warsaw, also known as the Porczyński Gallery or Carroll-Porczyński Collection, is a museum dedicated to its painting collection, which is housed in the building of the former stock exchange and Bank of Poland. The collection includes around 400 exhibits, copies of masterpieces of European painting.

== History ==
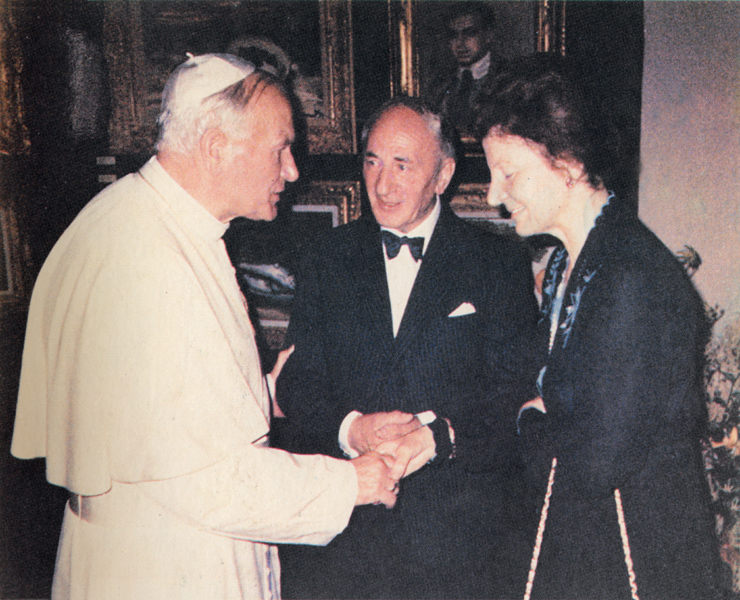
Pope John Paul II with Janina and Zbigniew Karol Porczynski

Zbigniew and Janina Porczyński have been amassing the collection since 1981. In the first three years, the couple concentrated on adding paintings with biblical themes but later portraits and impressionistic works were added. In 1986 the couple transferred about 400 exhibits to the Archdiocese of Warsaw and the Polish nation and created a foundation to supervise the collection. The first part of the collection was displayed publicly on 5 November 1987 at the Museum of the Warsaw archdiocese (Muzeum Archidiecezji Warszawskiej) at Solec Street. The second part was displayed from 14 September to 30 December 1988.

In 1989 the beneficiaries of the foundation, the Primate of Poland and the Polish Arts and Culture Ministry, decided to create a museum to provide a permanent display of the collection. The city of Warsaw provided the collection with a permanent home in a building designed by Antonio Corazzi in 1825 - the former stock exchange rebuilt after the Second World War destruction.

== Criticism ==
Since 1987 various art experts put in doubt the authenticity of many important works in the collection. The Polish art historians Mieczysław Morka and Waldemar Łysiak contributed several times to this criticism. A painting signed by Alfred Sisley (River landscape) is a forgery by Tom Keating.

Apart from forgery allegations and unclear financing of the foundation by the public sector, some other activities of the foundation were criticized (the organization of commercial events in the museum premises).

== Collection ==
The collection is displayed in eight rooms and arranged thematically: Impressionists, mythology and allegory, portraits and self-portraits (in the two-story hall "Rotunda"), mothers and children, effigies of the Madonna and Child, biblical themes, still lifes and landscapes (in the gallery) and a room dedicated to the monumental painting Baptism of Lithuania (1889) by Wojciech Gerson.

The majority of the collection consists of works by British, Dutch, Early Netherlandish, Flemish, French, German, Italian, Spanish and Swiss Old Masters, their pupils and followers. Among the artists represented are Paris Bordone, Cornelis van Haarlem, José de Ribera, William-Adolphe Bouguereau, Pierre-Auguste Renoir, Vincent van Gogh and a significant collection of paintings by Swiss painter Fritz Zuber-Bühler.

Sculpture is represented with bronze casts of Jupiter and the eagle by Julien Dillens, the Head of Saint John the Baptist by Auguste Rodin and the Unicorn by Salvador Dalí.

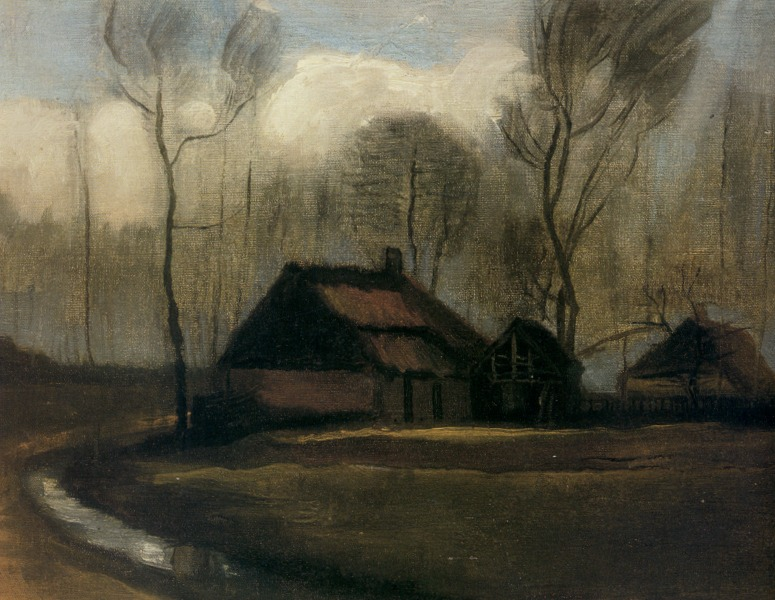
Farmhouses Among Trees (1883), Vincent van Gogh

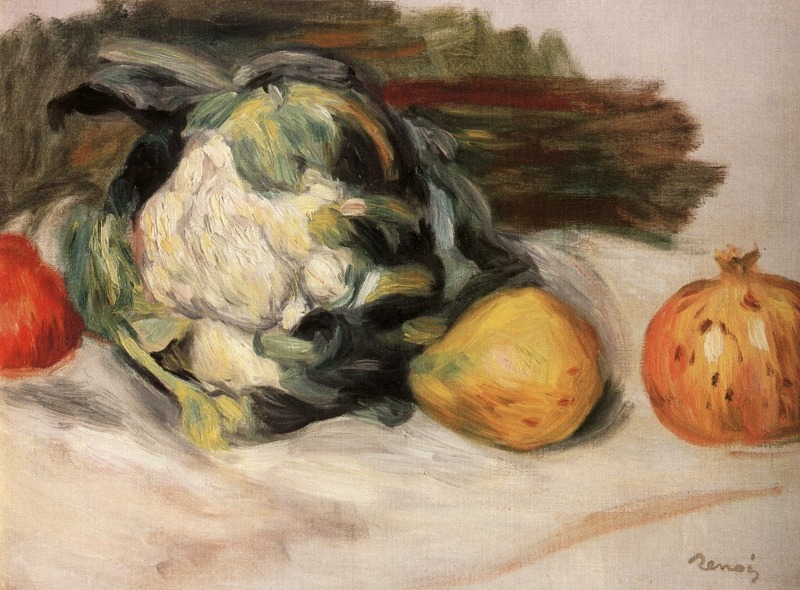
Cauliflower and Pomegranates (c. 1890), Pierre-Auguste Renoir

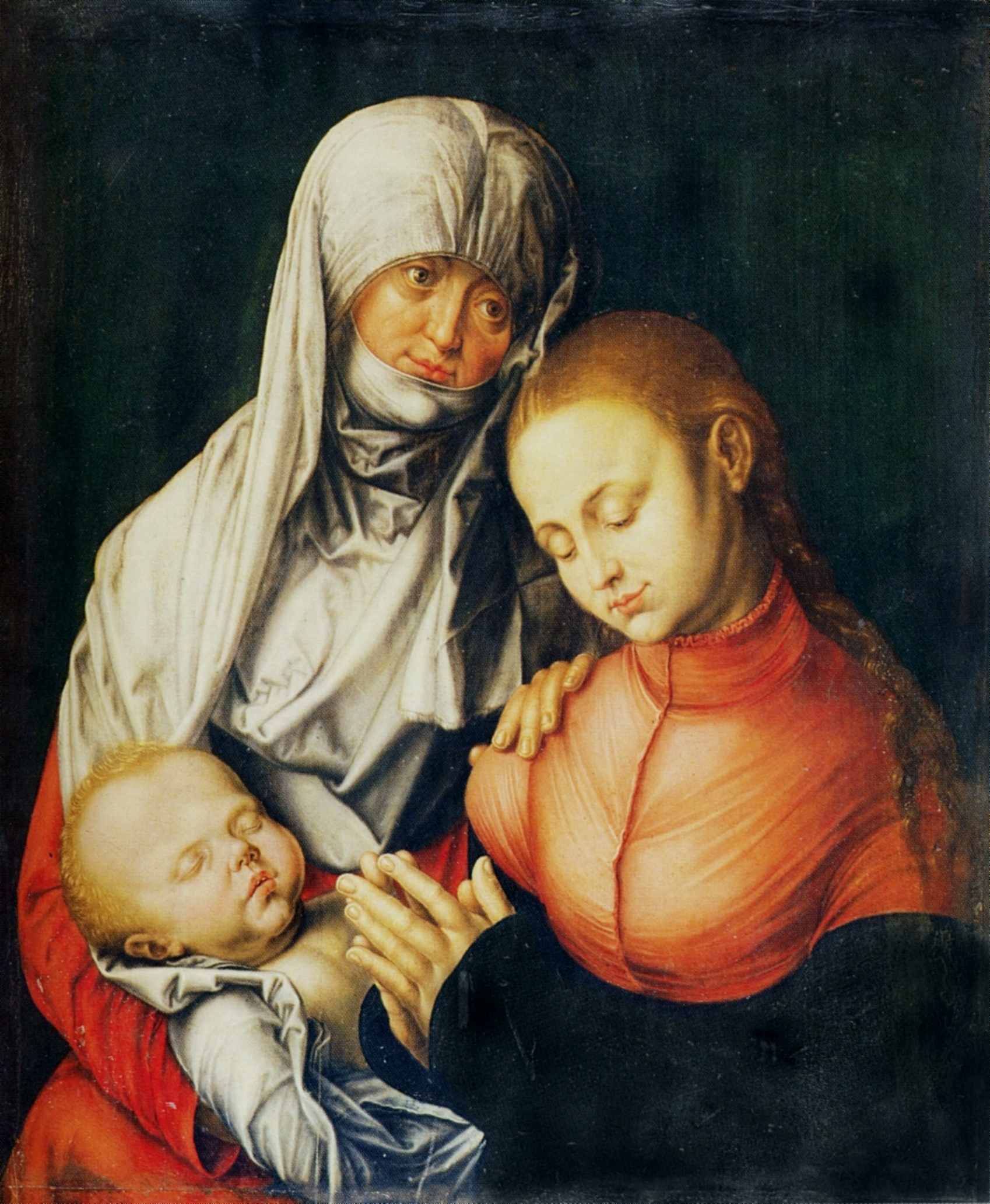
Virgin and Child with Saint Anne, Albrecht Dürer

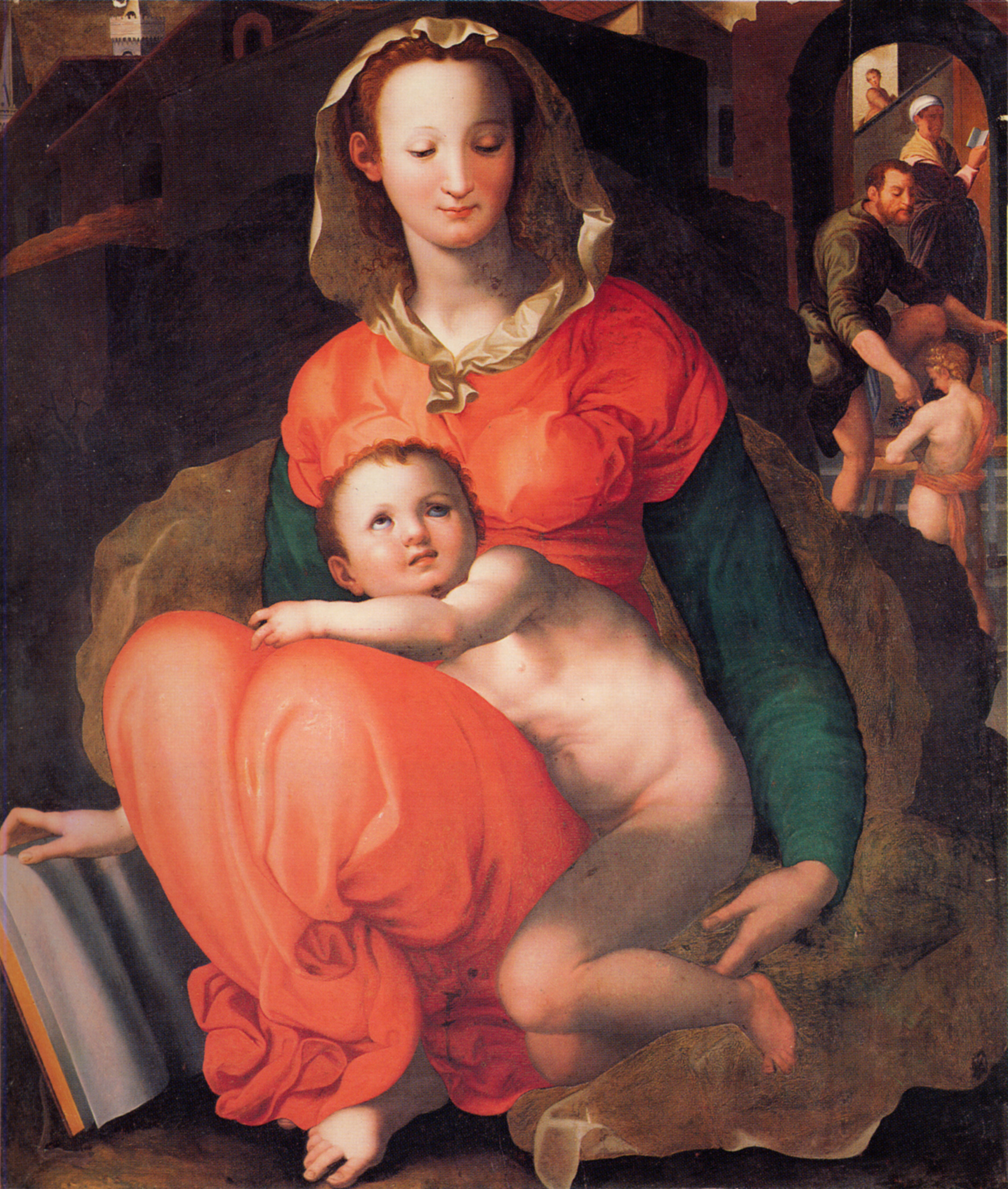
Virgin and Child, Jacopo Pontormo

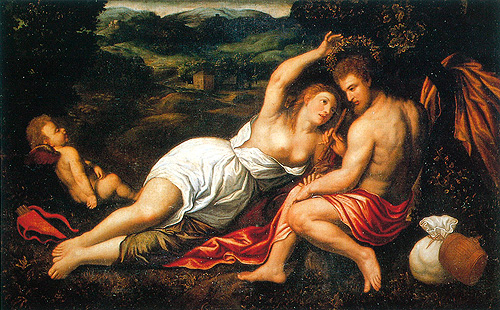
Daphnis and Chloe, Paris Bordone

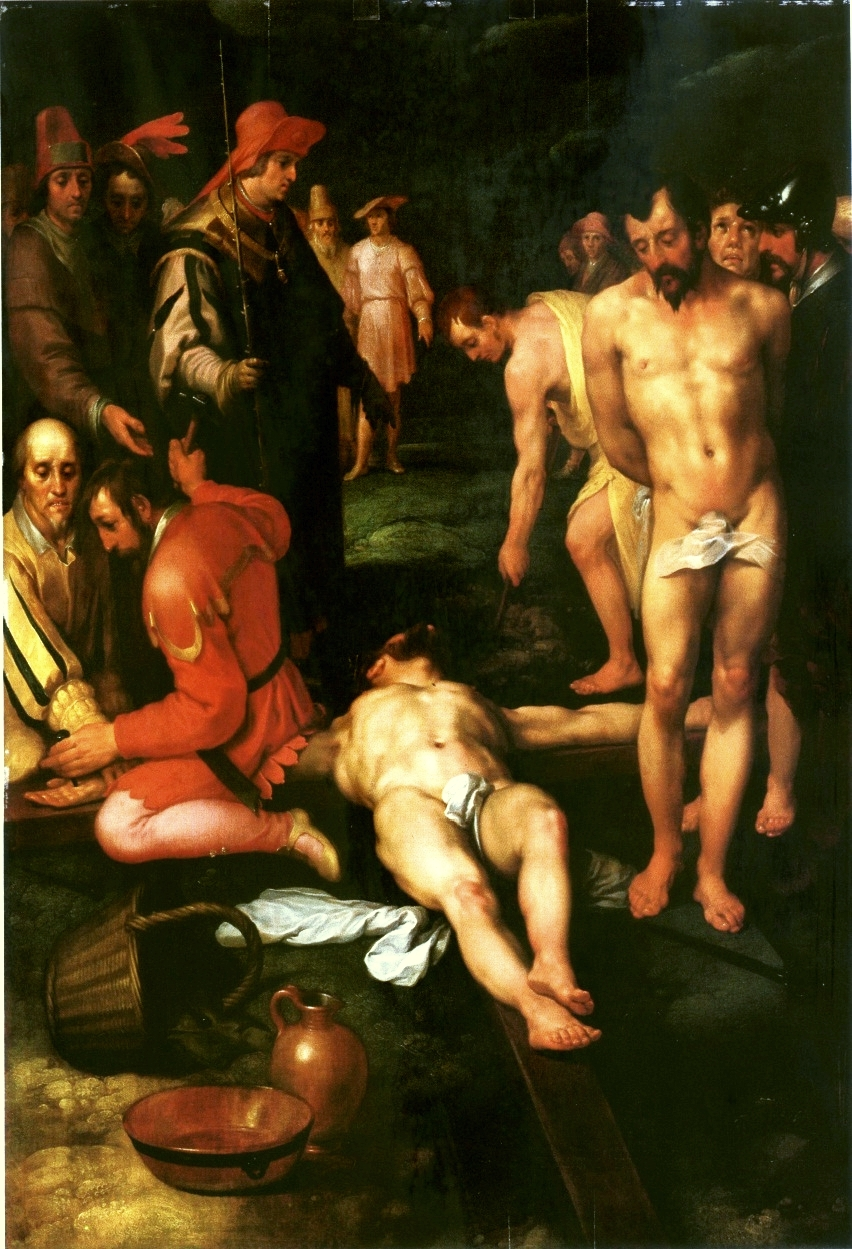
Nailing to the Cross, Cornelis van Haarlem

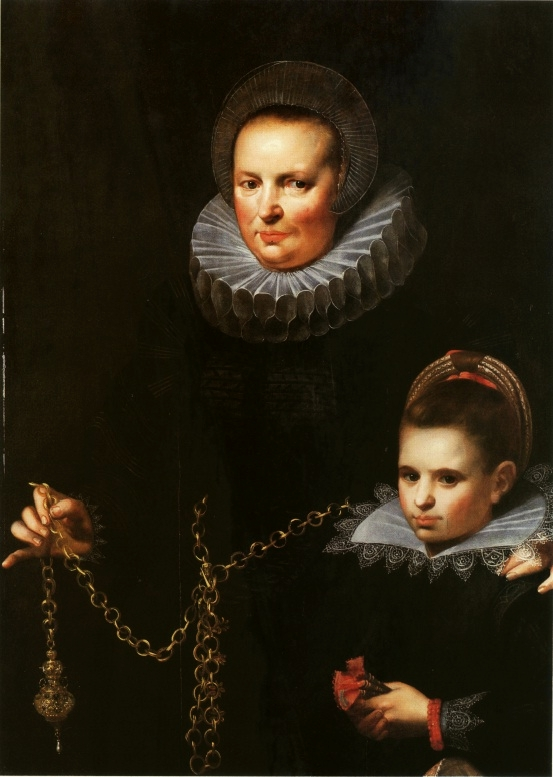
Portrait of Mother and Daughter, Cornelis de Vos

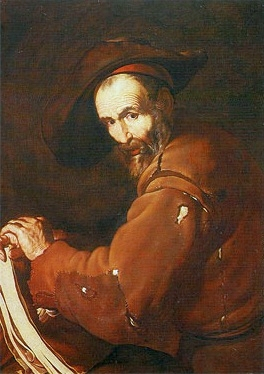
A Philosopher, José de Ribera

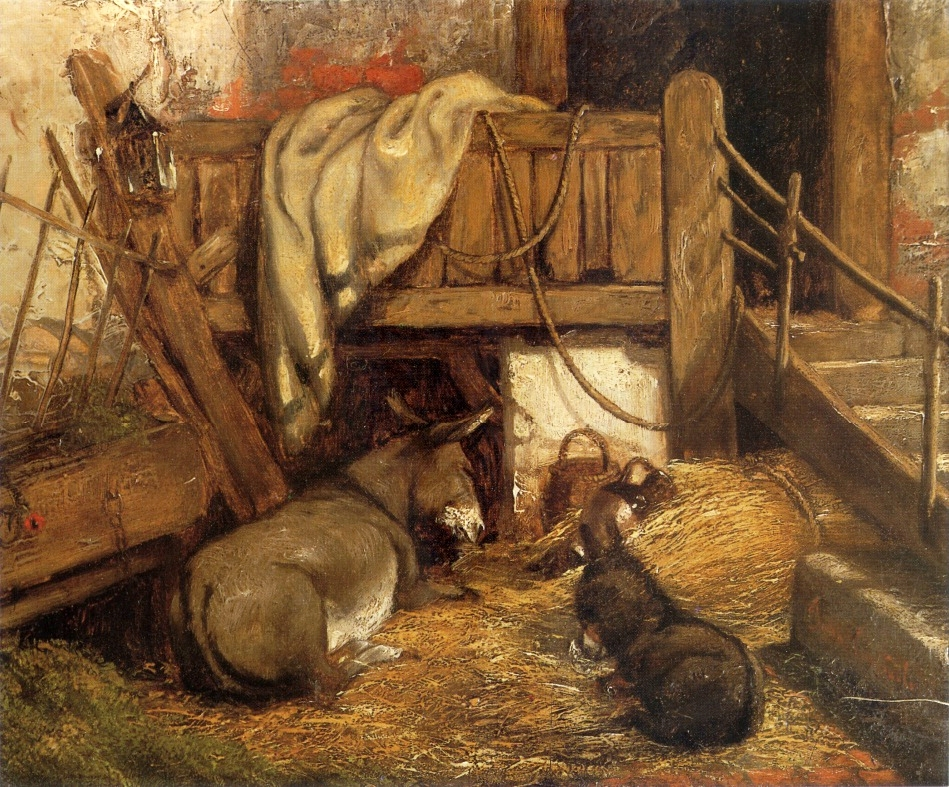
Donkeys in the Stable, John Constable

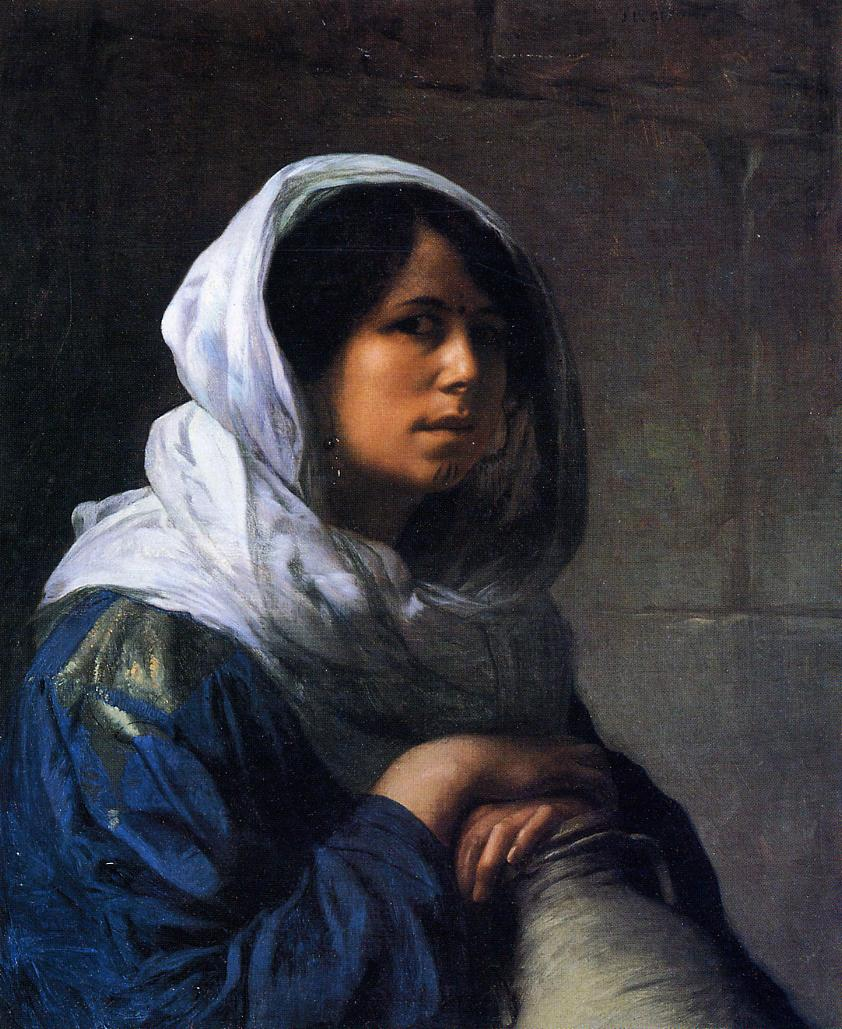
Egyptian Water Carrier, Jean-Léon Gérôme

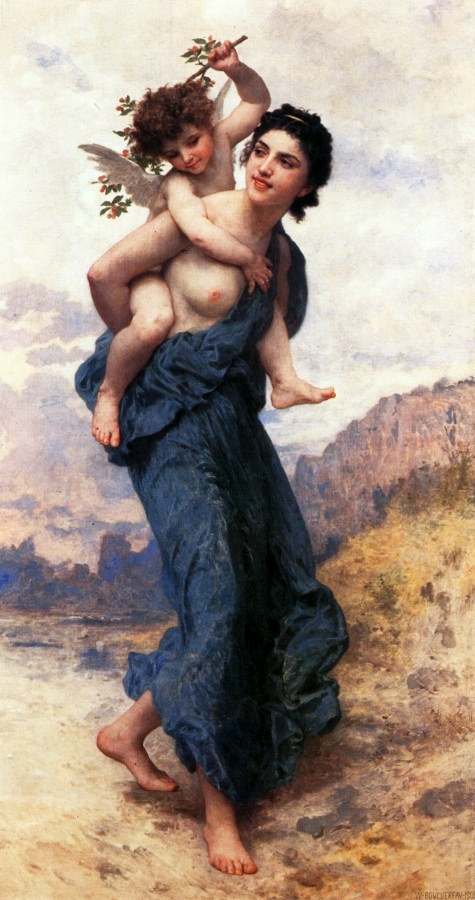
Venus and Cupid, William-Adolphe Bouguereau

Portrait of a Young Girl in Pink Dress, Raimundo de Madrazo y Garreta

== See also ==
- List of museums in Poland
- National Museum, Warsaw
