= Almond Blossoms =

1888–1890 paintings by Vincent van Gogh

Almond Blossom, 1890
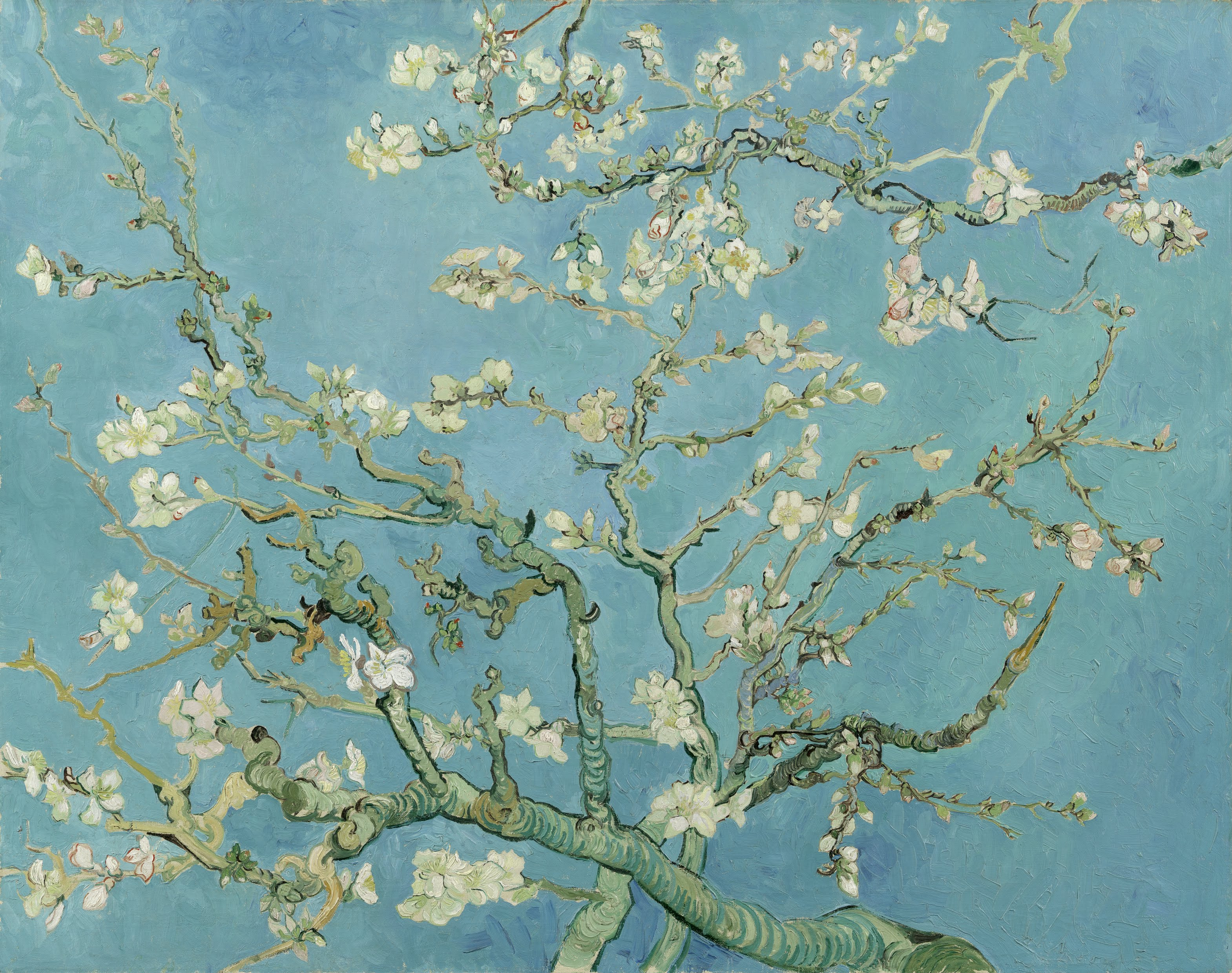
- Artist: Vincent van Gogh
- Year: 1890
- Catalogue: F671; JH1891
- Medium: Oil on canvas
- Dimensions: 73.5 cm × 92 cm (28.9 in × 36 in)
- Location: Van Gogh Museum; Amsterdam

Almond Blossoms is a group of several paintings made in 1888 and 1890 by Vincent van Gogh in Arles and Saint-Rémy, southern France of blossoming almond trees. Flowering trees were special to van Gogh. They represented awakening and hope. He enjoyed them aesthetically and found joy in painting flowering trees. The works reflect the influence of Impressionism, Divisionism, and Japanese woodcuts. Almond Blossom was made to celebrate the birth of his nephew and namesake, son of his brother Theo and sister-in-law Jo.

== Southern France ==
In 1888 van Gogh became inspired in southern France and began the most productive period of his painting career. In connection with his painting Farmhouse in Provence (1888), the National Gallery of Art notes that:

It was sun that van Gogh sought in Provence, a brilliance and light that would wash out detail and simplify forms, reducing the world around him to the sort of pattern he admired in Japanese woodblocks. Arles, he said, was "the Japan of the South." Here, he felt, the flattening effect of the sun would strengthen the outlines of compositions and reduce nuances of color to a few vivid contrasts. Pairs of complements—the red and green of the plants, the woven highlights of oranges and blue in the fence, even the pink clouds that enliven the turquoise sky — almost vibrate against each other.

When van Gogh arrived in Arles in March 1888 fruit trees in the orchards were about to bloom. The blossoms of the apricot, peach and plum trees motivated him, and within a month he had created fourteen paintings of blossoming fruit trees. Excited by the subject matter, van Gogh completed nearly one painting a day. Around April 21 he wrote to Theo, that he "will have to seek something new, now the orchards have almost finished blossoming."

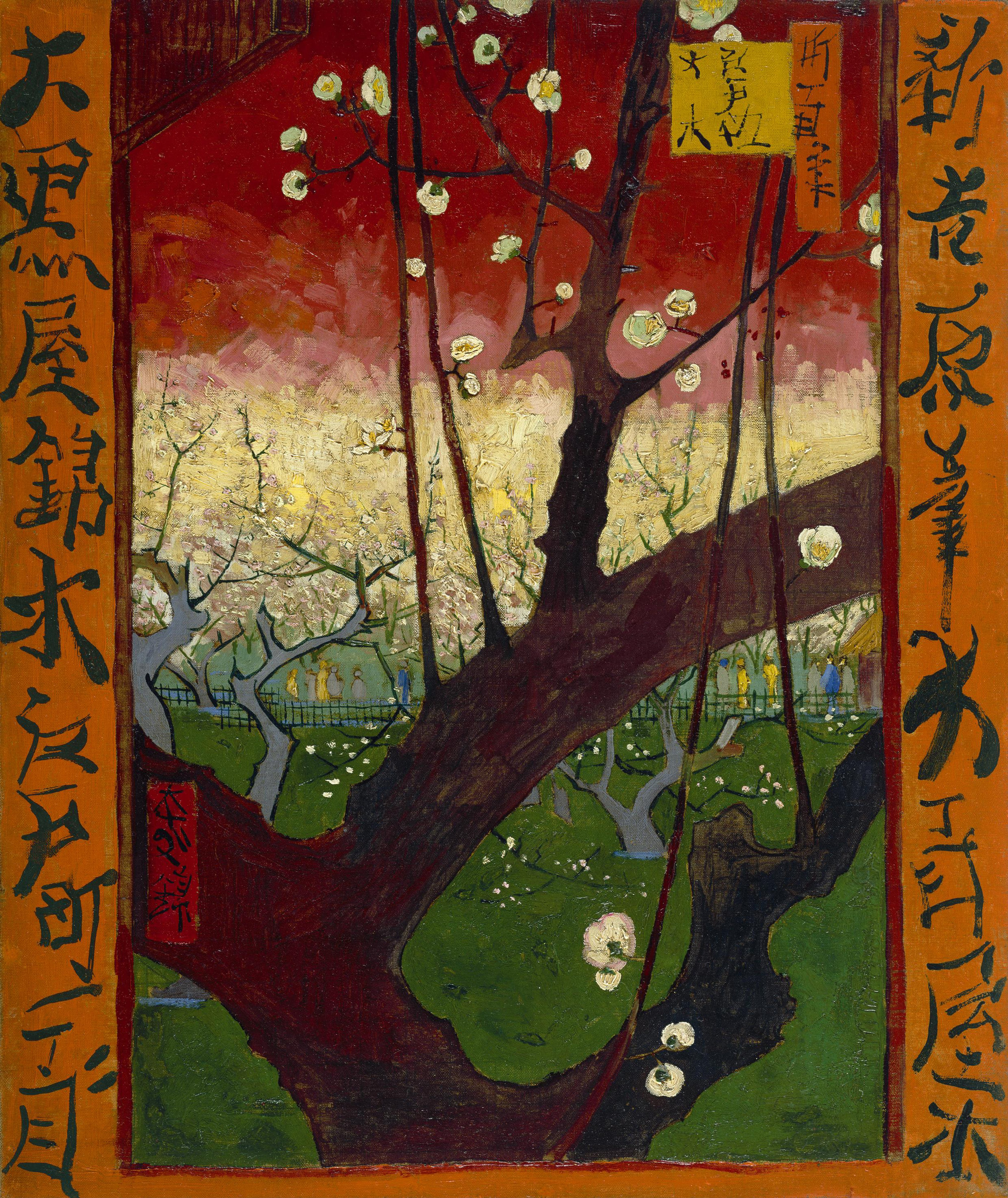
Japonaiserie Flowering Plum Tree (after Hiroshige) by Vincent van Gogh, 1887 Van Gogh Museum, Amsterdam (F371)

Van Gogh's work reflected his interest in Japanese wood block prints. Hiroshige's Plum Park in Kameido demonstrates portrayal of beautiful subject matter with flat patterns of colors and no shadow. Van Gogh used the term Japonaiserie to express this influence; he collected hundreds of Japanese prints and likened the works of the great Japanese artists, like Hiroshige, to those of Rembrandt, Hals, and Vermeer. Hiroshige was one of the last great masters of the Japanese genre called ukiyo-e. Van Gogh integrated some of the technical aspects of ukiyo-e into his work as his two 1887 homages to Hiroshige demonstrates.

The Japanese paintings represent Van Gogh's search for serenity, which he describes in a letter to his sister, "Having as much of this serenity as possible, even though one knows little – nothing – for certain, is perhaps a better remedy for all diseases than all the things that are sold at the chemist's shop." The southern region and the flowering trees seem to awaken van Gogh from his doldrums into a state of clear direction, hyper-activity and good cheer. He wrote, "I am up to my ears in work for the trees are in blossom and I want to paint a Provençal orchard of astonishing gaiety." While in the past a very active period would have drained him, this time he was invigorated.

== Blossoming Almond Branch in a Glass with a Book ==
Vincent wrote to Theo, "Down here it is freezing hard and there is still snow in the countryside," and he has "two small studies of an almond-tree branch already in flower in spite of it." The two studies are Blossoming Almond Branch in a Glass and Blossoming Almond Branch in a Glass with a Book.

== Blossoming Almond Branch in a Glass ==
Although fruit trees were about to bloom when Vincent arrived in Arles, the town had just received a layer of snow, driving van Gogh inside for his first week in Arles where he worked on still life, such as a branch from an almond tree. To reflect the early signs of spring, he used delicate brushstrokes and pastel shades for Blossoming Almond Branch in a Glass.

In Art Inspiring Transmutations of Life, Bruce Ross evaluates the Impressionists' effect on van Gogh's work,

Van Gogh's bright Sprig of Flowering Almond in a Glass embodies these streams* while exploring Japanese aesthetic values. A broken-off sprig is set in a simple glass. The sprig is highlighted by a red line along the beige wall and lavish empty space. There is no formal decorative intent. Van Gogh's name, also in bright red, hovers above a sprig in the upper left as if a symbol of hope. Van Gogh has transformed the still life with the help of these values. He has imbued a form predicated on death to one focused on life and possibility. His use of bright color reflects this. There is an individual, and hence essential, character to his subject, a sprig of almond buds and opening blossoms. This still life resembles the Japanese art of flower arrangement, ikebana, in its simplicity and evoked hopefulness as well as in its formal use of empty space.

Blossoming Almond Branch in a Glass painted by van Gogh

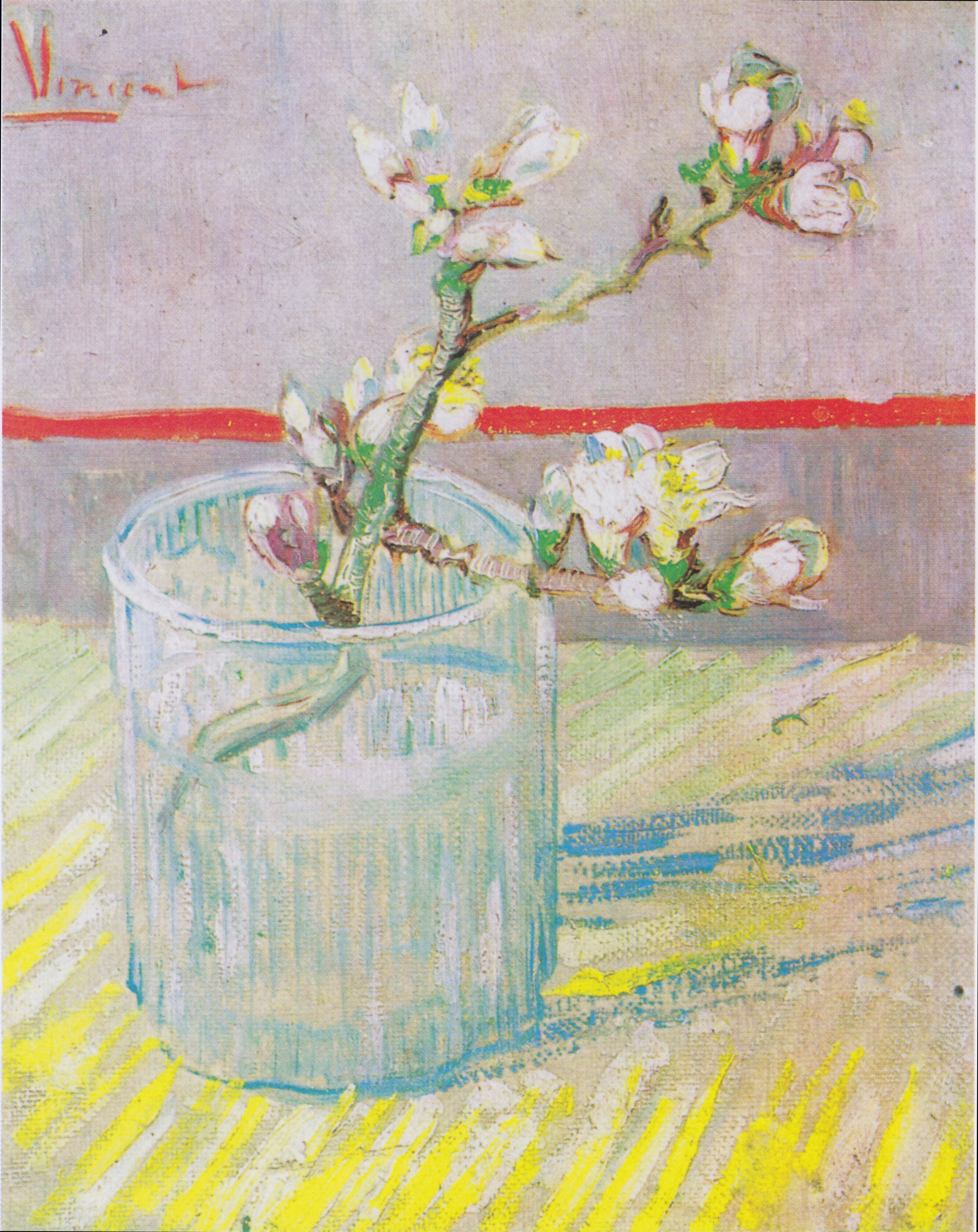
Blossoming Almond Branch in a Glass
1888
Van Gogh Museum, Amsterdam (F392)

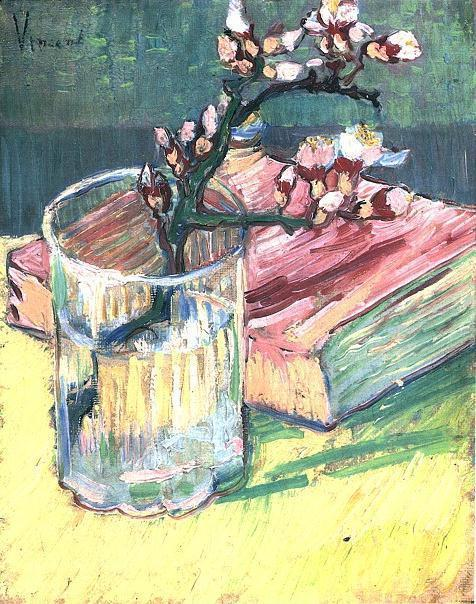
Blossoming Almond Branch in a Glass with a Book
1888
Private Collection (F393)

== Almond Blossom ==
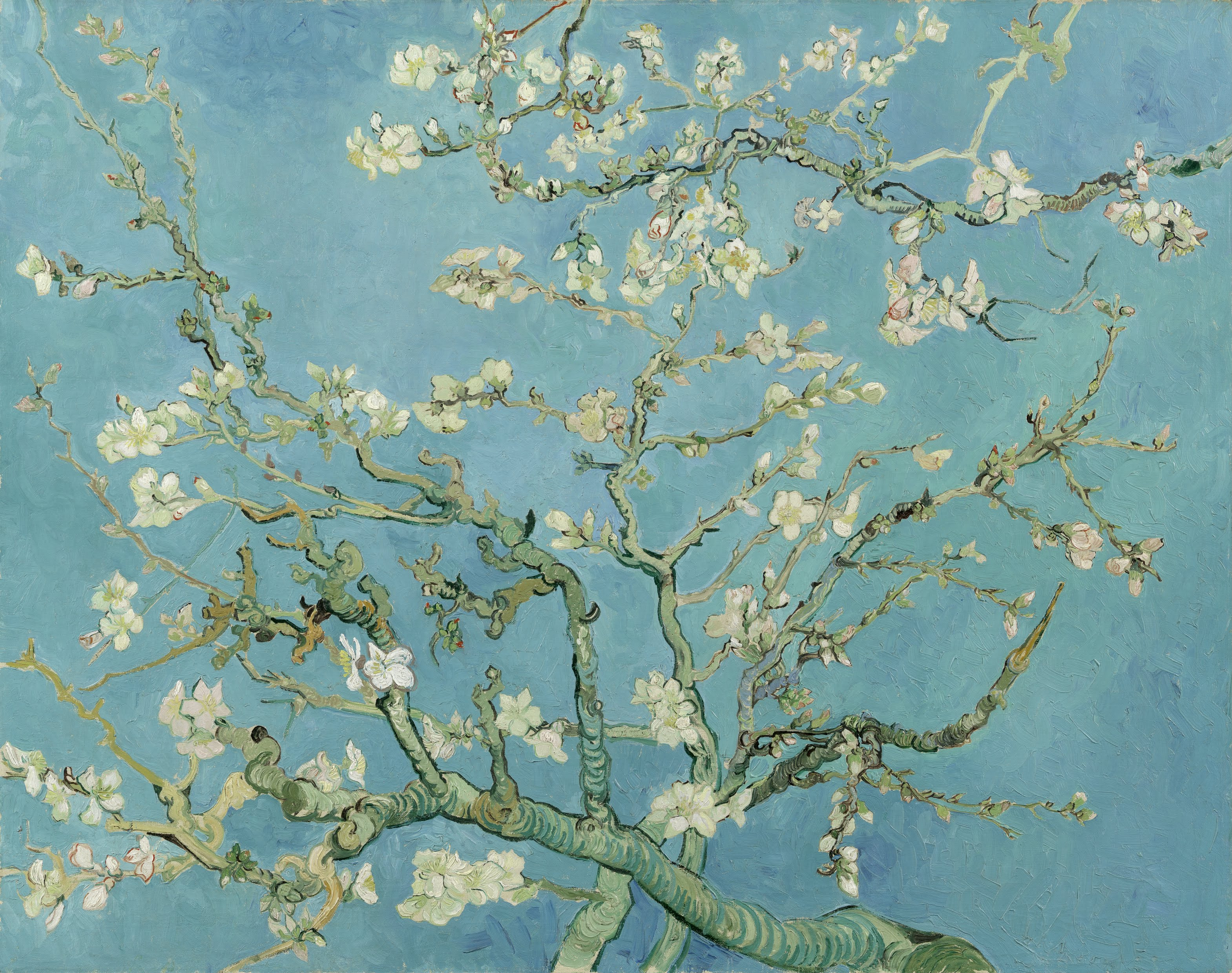
Almond Blossoms, 1890 Van Gogh Museum, (F671)

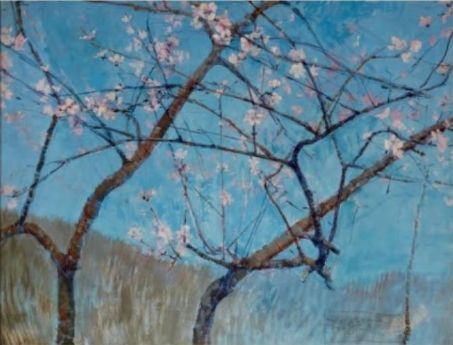
Almond Trees in Blossom, painted in 1887 by Van Gogh's friend John Russell, may have inspired Almond Blossoms.

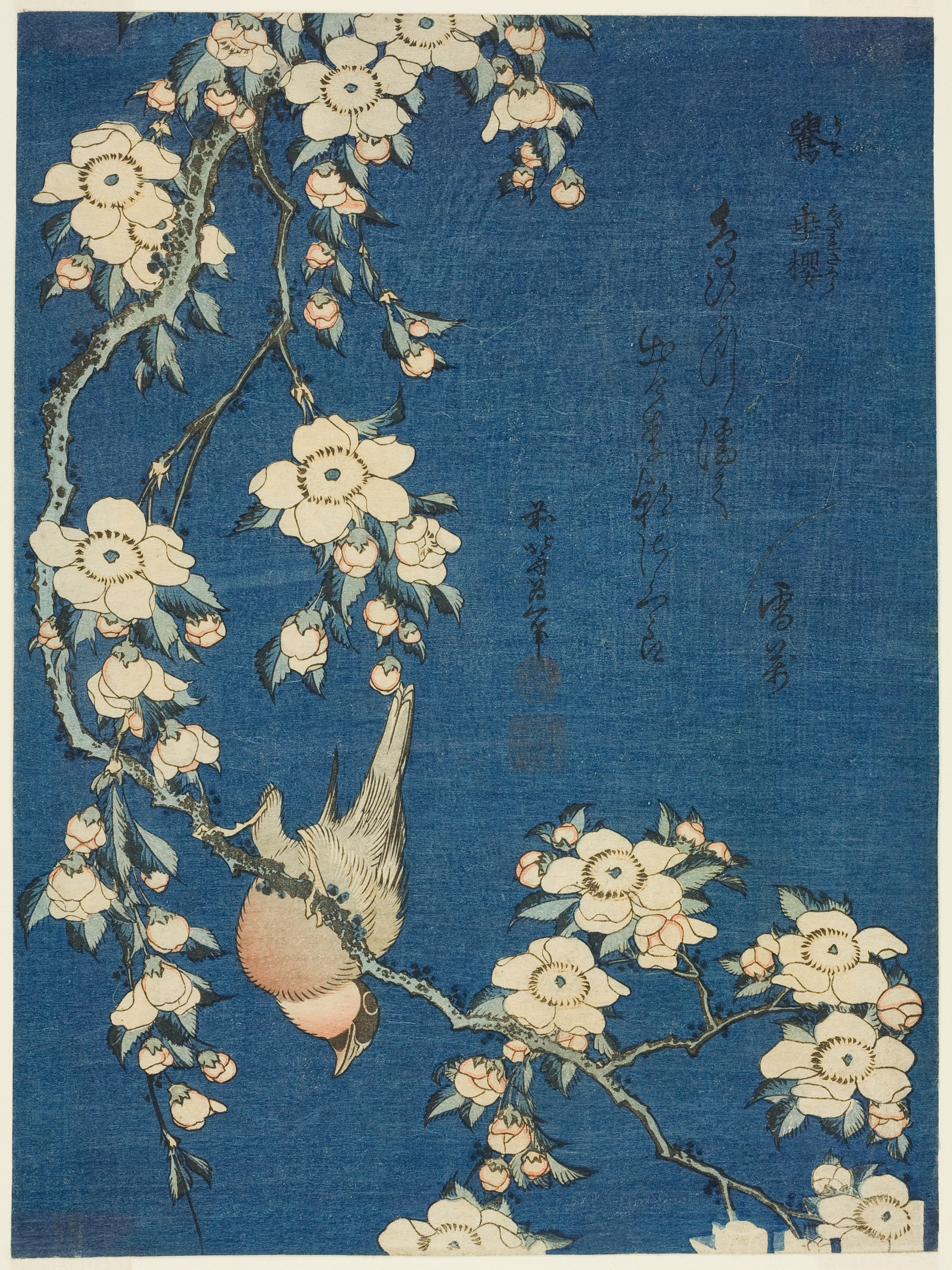
Bullfinch and Weeping Cherry by Hokusai

In mid-March 1888 van Gogh writes of the weather and that the almond trees are coming into full flower, "The weather here is changeable, often windy with turbulent skies, but the almond trees are beginning to flower everywhere."

Mancoff says of flowering trees and this work,

In his flowering trees, Vincent attained a sense of spontaneity, freeing himself from the strict self-analytical approach he took in Paris. In Almond Tree in Blossom, Vincent used the light, broken strokes of impressionism and the dabs of colour of divisionism for a sparkling surface effect. The distinctive contours of the tree and its position in the foreground recall the formal qualities of Japanese prints.

The rendering of Almond Blossom is positioned close and accessible to the viewer and the branches appear to reach out beyond the painting's frame.

Theo wrote to his brother Vincent on January 31, 1890, to announce the birth of his son, Vincent Willem van Gogh. As a means of celebration, Vincent began work on a painting for Theo and his wife. He was very close to his brother and he sought to symbolize new life in the flowers of the almond tree for the birth of baby Vincent.

Vincent wrote to his mother of the birth of Theo and Jo's baby,

How glad I was when the news came... I should have greatly preferred him to call the boy after Father, of whom I have been thinking so much these days, instead of after me; but seeing it has now been done, I started right away to make a picture for him, to hang in their bedroom, big branches of white almond blossom against a blue sky.

The composition is unlike any other of van Gogh's paintings. The branches of the almond tree seem to float against the blue sky and fill the picture plane. The close-up of the branches brings to mind Delacroix's proposition that "even a part of a thing is kind of a complete entity in itself." Dark lines outline the branches. This is a feature that Van Gogh had admired in Japanese floral studies that, for example, may depict a portion of a stalk of bamboo in an empty space. The bright color is reflective of the paintings made in Arles and the transformational work van Gogh had on the still life genre.

Van Gogh biographer Steven Naifeh speculates that in painting Almond Blossoms, Van Gogh drew inspiration from his friend John Russell's 1887 painting Almond Trees in Blossom. Russell in turn may have derived his work from Japanese artist Hokusai's 1833 woodblock Bullfinch and Weeping Cherry.

== Related works ==
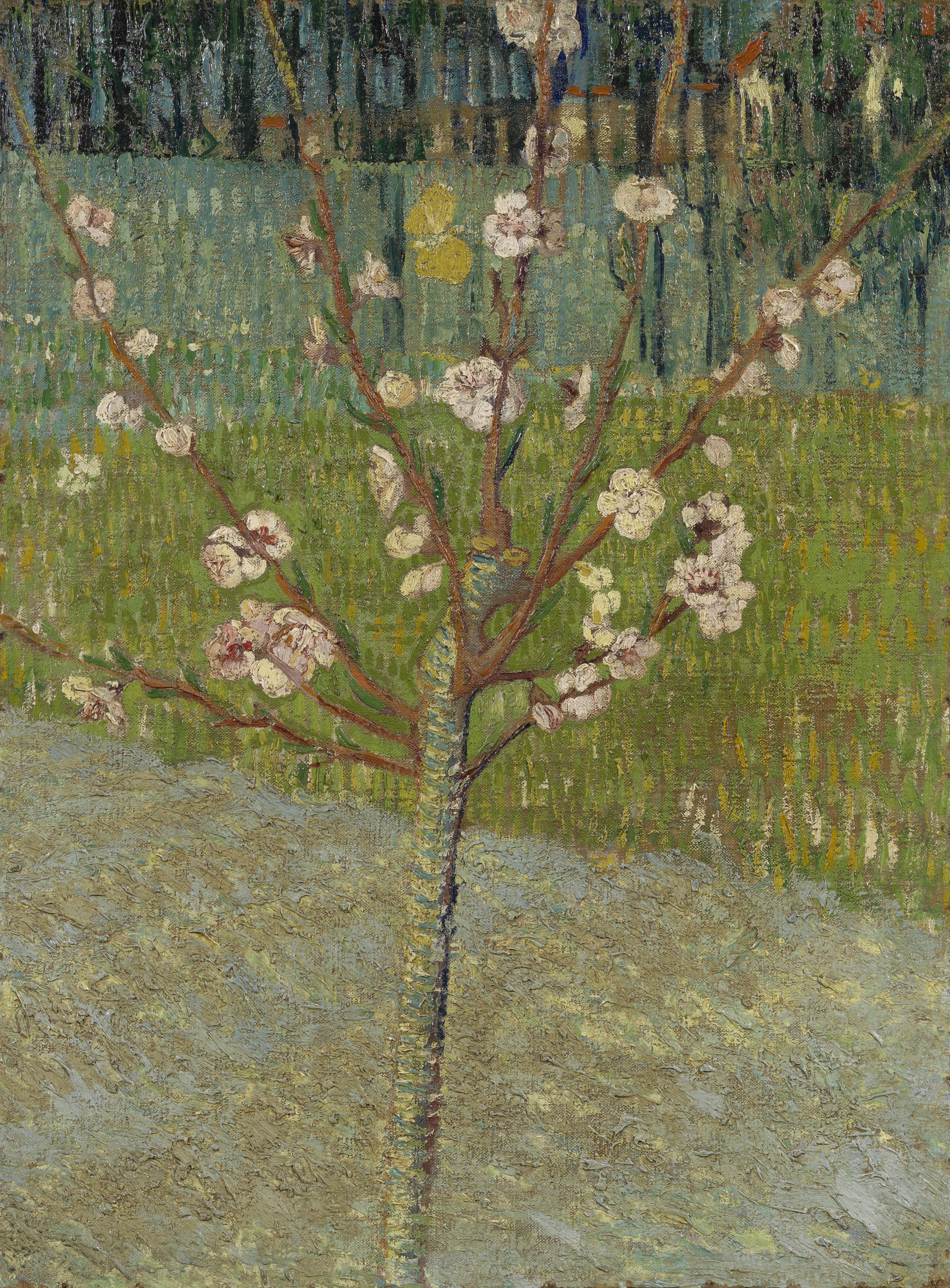
Almond Tree in Bloom, 1888
Van Gogh Museum, Amsterdam (F557)

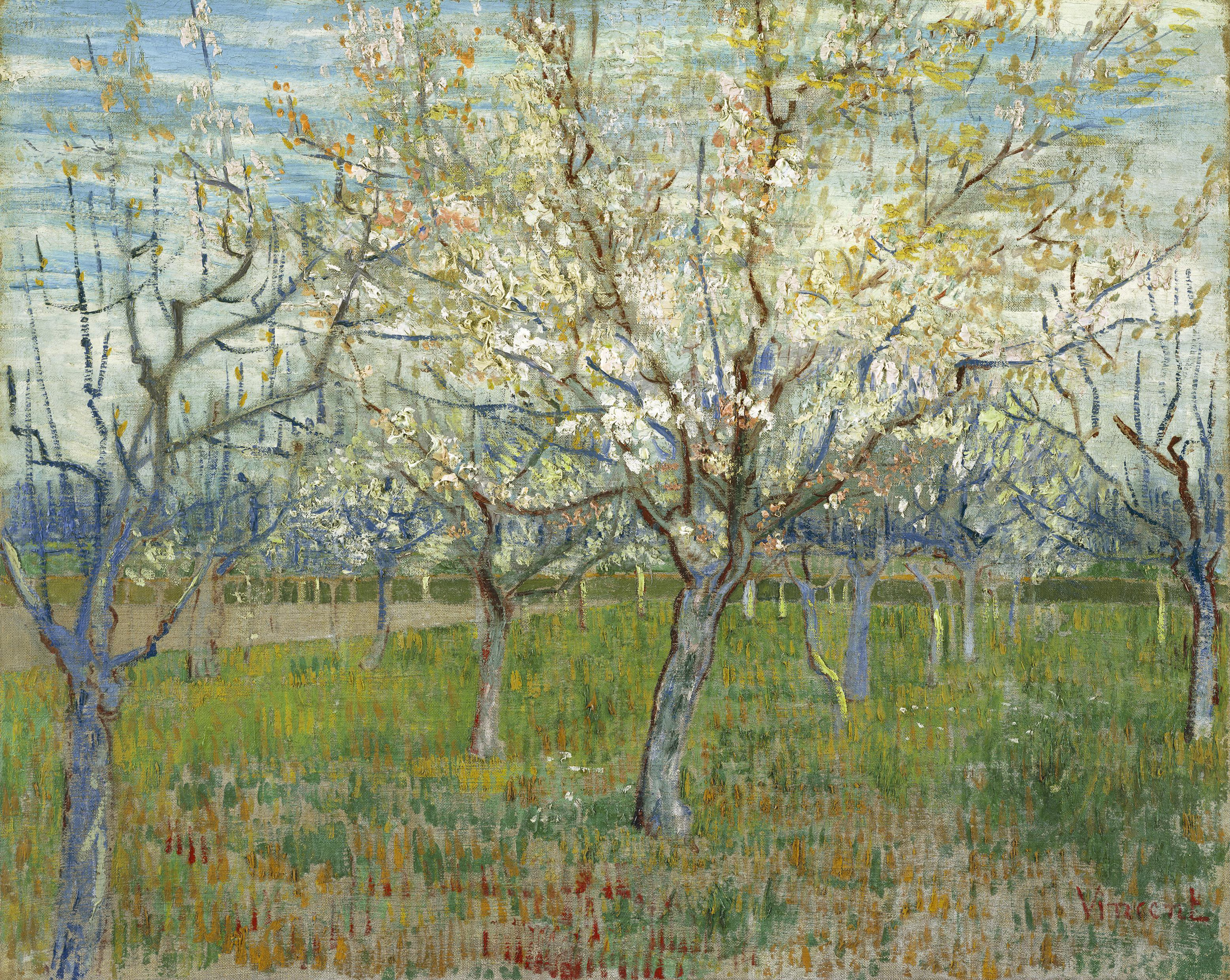
The Pink Orchard also Orchard with Blossoming Apricot Trees, March 1888
Van Gogh Museum, (F555)

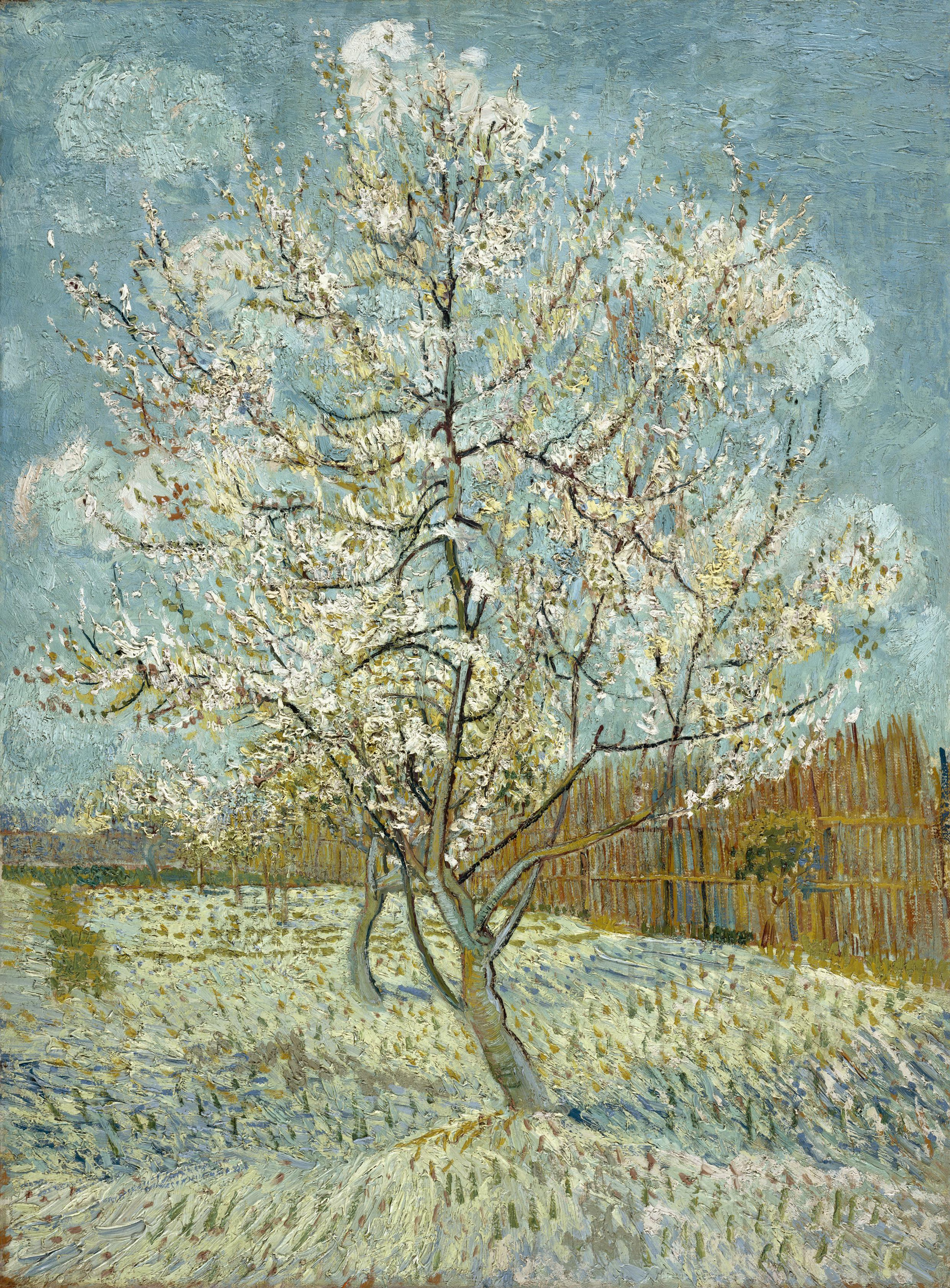
Peach Tree in Blossom, March–April 1888
Van Gogh Museum, (F404)

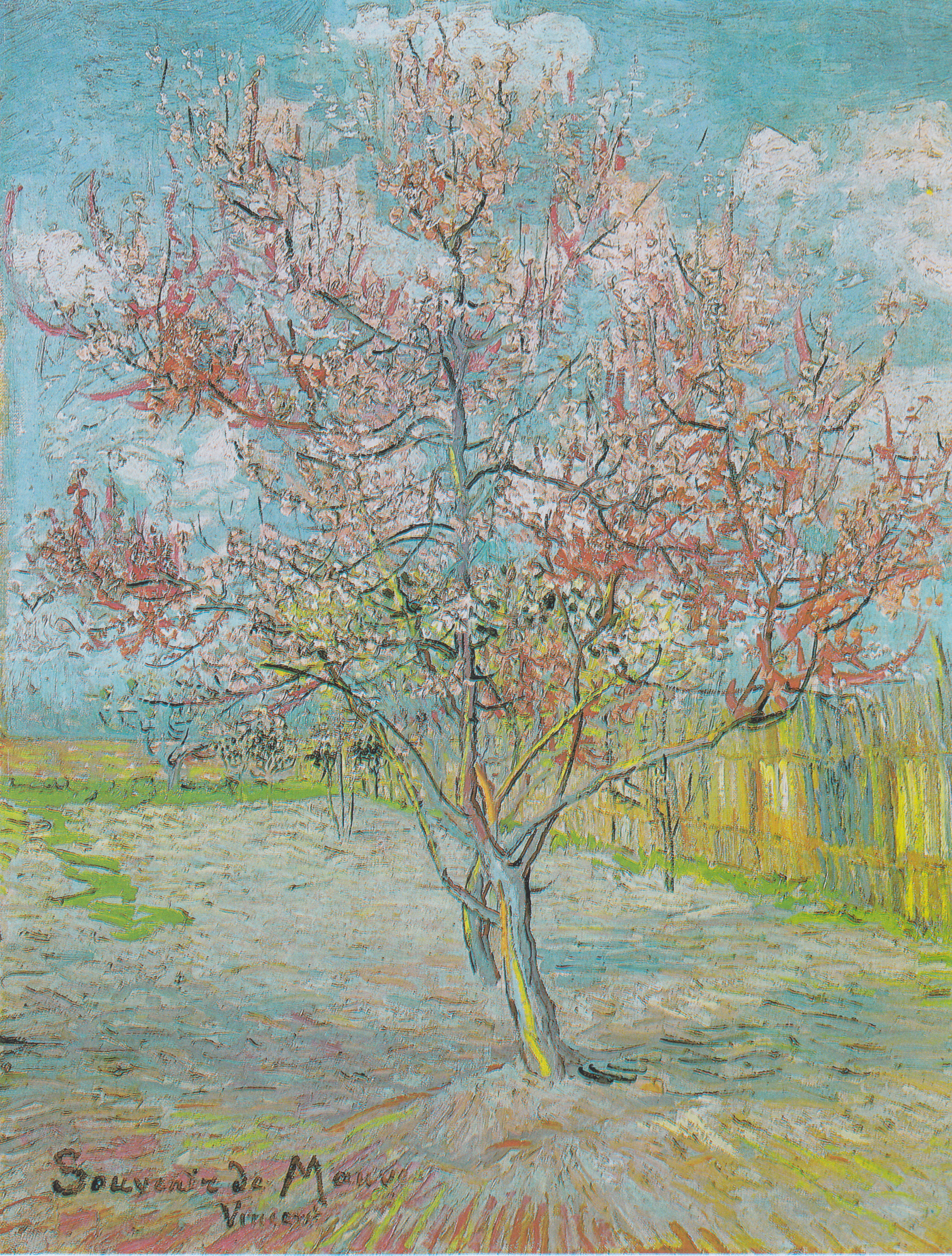
Flowering peach trees also Souvenir de Mauve, 1888
Kröller-Müller Museum

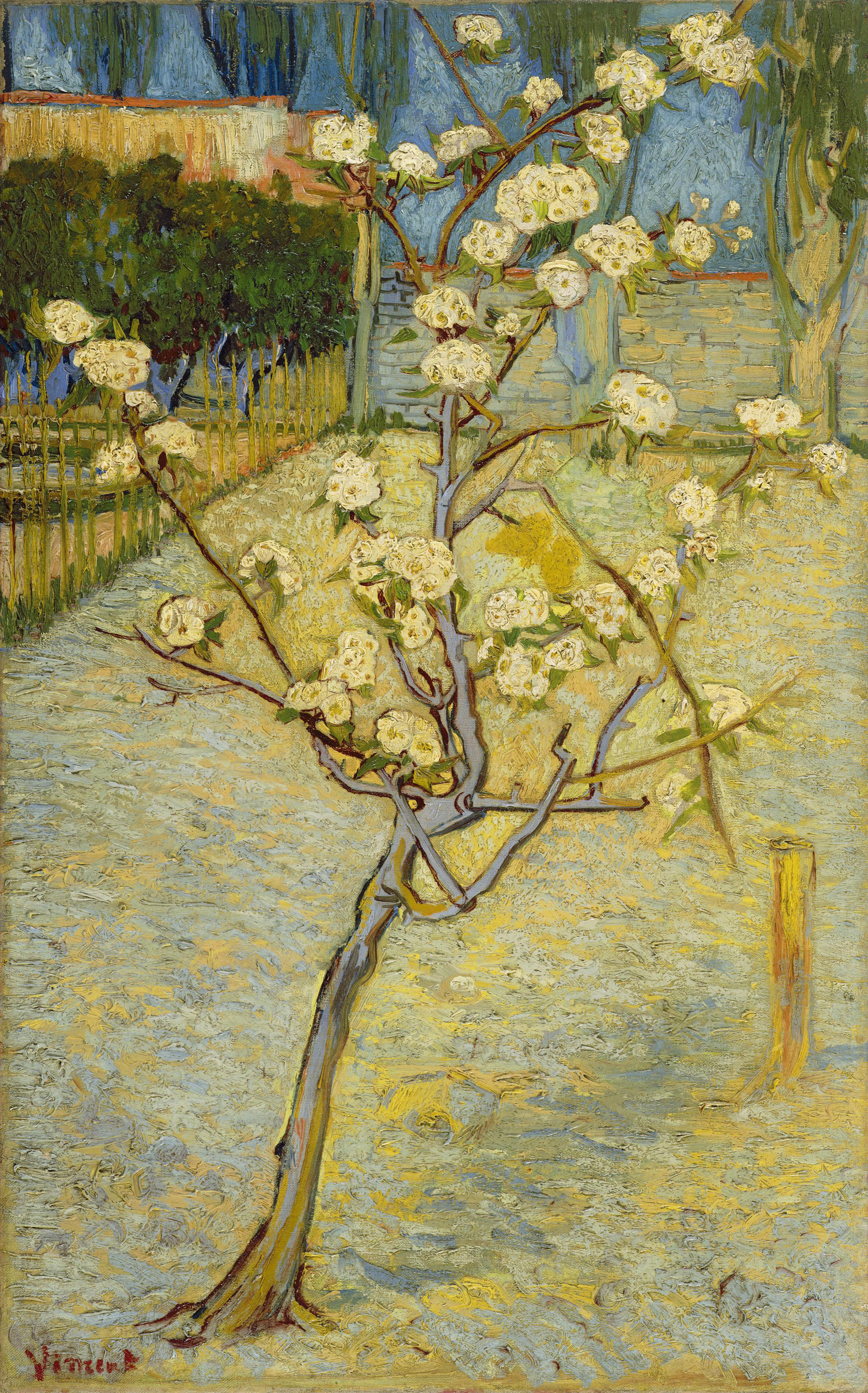
Blossoming Pear Tree, March–April 1888
Van Gogh Museum, (F405)

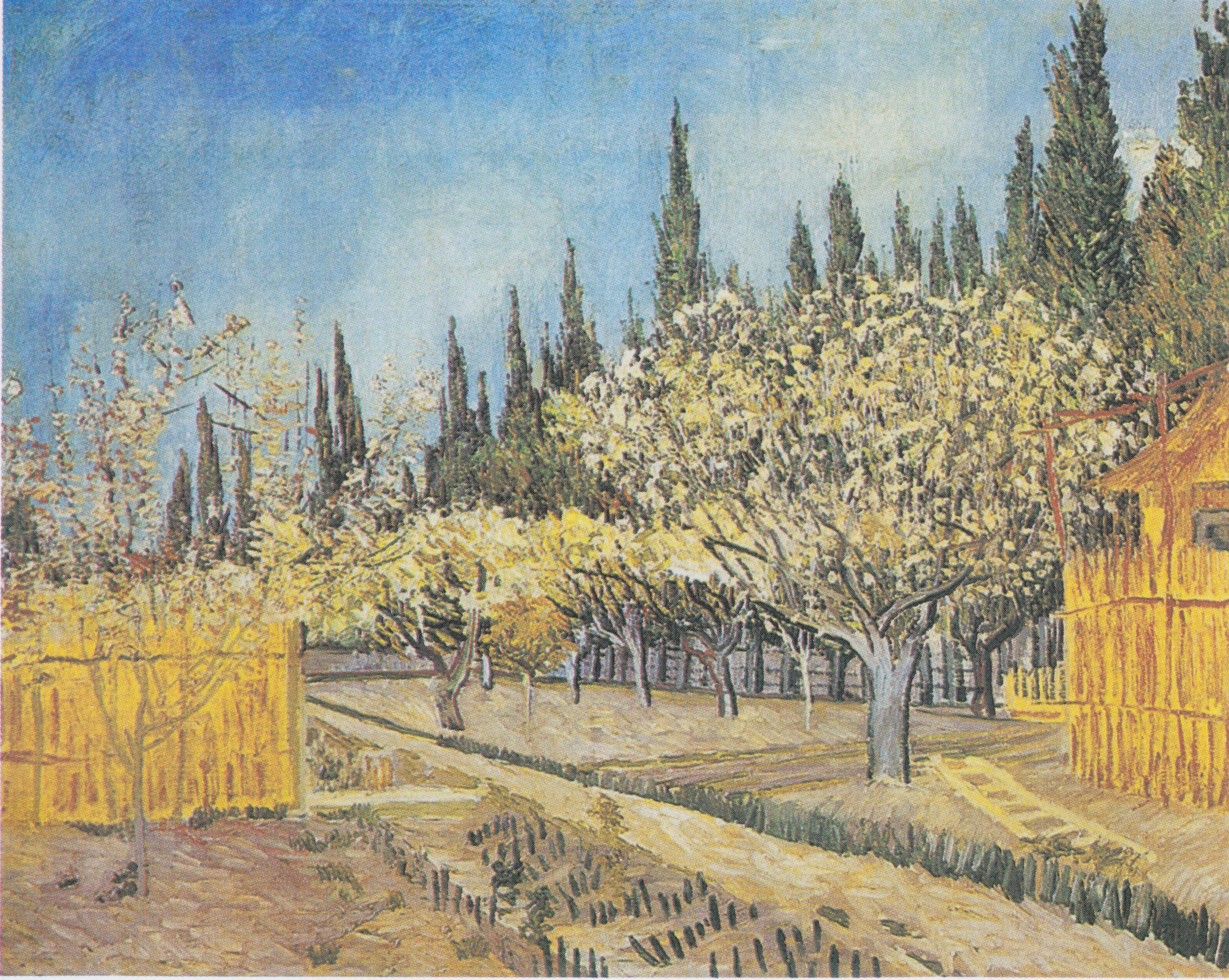
Orchard in Blossom, Bordered by Cypresses, April 1888
Kröller-Müller Museum, (F513)

== See also ==
- List of works by Vincent van Gogh
