= Farmhouse in Provence =

Painting by Vincent van Gogh

- Artist: Vincent van Gogh
- Year: 1888
- Medium: Oil on canvas
- Movement: Post Impressionism
- Dimensions: 46.1 cm × 60.9 cm (18.1 in × 24.0 in)
- Location: National Gallery of Art; Washington, D.C.

Farmhouse in Provence, also known as Entrance Gate to a Farm with Haystacks, is an oil-on-canvas painting produced in 1888 by Dutch painter Vincent van Gogh in Arles, Provence, at the height of his career. Partially due to having been inspired by painter Adolphe Monticelli, Van Gogh sought the Provence region of France to further expand his painting skill and experience. Van Gogh used several pairs of complementary colors in the Farmhouse in Provence, the color contrast bringing an intensity to his work. The painting is owned by the National Gallery of Art in Washington, D.C.

== Arles ==
At the time that Van Gogh painted Farmhouse in Provence, he was 35 years old. Living in Arles, in southern France, he was at the height of his career, producing some of his best work, such as fields, farmhouses and people of the Arles, Nîmes and Avignon area.

The area was quite different from what he'd known in the Netherlands and Paris. The climate was hot and dry. People had dark hair and skin and spoke a different language than Parisian French. The colors were vivid. The terrain varied from plains to mountains. Here Van Gogh found a "brilliance and light that would wash out details and simplify forms, reducing the world around him to the sort of pattern he admired in Japanese woodblocks" and where the "effect of the sun would strengthen the outlines of composition and reduce nuances of color to a few vivid contrasts."

A prolific time, in less than 444 days Vincent made about 100 drawings and produced more than 200 paintings Yet, he still wrote more than 200 letters. He described a series of seven studies of wheat fields as, "landscapes, yellow—old gold—done quickly, quickly, quickly, and in a hurry just like the harvester who is silent under the blazing sun, intent only on the reaping."

In a letter to his brother, Theo, he wrote, "Painting as it is now, promises to become more subtle—more like music and less like sculpture—and above all, it promises color."

== The painting ==
Van Gogh used three pairs of complementary, or contrasting, colors which when sat together intensified the brilliance and intensity of one another's colors. One pair is orange and blue. Another would be the red and green of the plants. Last, pink clouds against the turquoise sky.

Van Gogh used complementary, contrasting colors to bring an intensity to his work, which evolved over the periods of his work. Two complementary colors of the same degree of vividness and brightness placed next to one another produce an intense reaction, called the "law of simultaneous contrast."

Van Gogh mentioned the liveliness and interplay of "a wedding of two complementary colors, their mingling and opposition, the mysterious vibrations of two kindred souls."

While in Nuenen Van Gogh became familiar with Michel Eugène Chevreul's laws in weaving to maximize the intensity of colors through their contrast to adjacent colors.

In Paris he was exposed through his brother Theo to Adolphe Monticelli's still life work with flowers, which he admired. First, he saw Monticelli's use of color as an expansion of Delacroix's theories of color and contrast. Secondly he admired the effect Monticelli created by heavy application of paint. It was partially Monticelli, from Marseilles, who inspired Van Gogh's southerly move to Provence. He felt such kinship for the man, and desire to emulate his style, that he wrote in a letter to his sister Wil that he felt as if he were "Monticelli's son or his brother."

== Provenance ==
The National Gallery of Art reports the correct sequence of ownership for the painting is:

- Johanna van Gogh-Bonger (1862–1925), the artist's sister-in-law, of Amsterdam sold the painting in November 1890 through Julien Tanguy Gallery, Paris to the Danish art dealer, Willy Gretor. Five paintings that were sold by Johanna became part of the National Gallery of Art collection.
- Willy Gretor gifted the painting to Maria Slavona, a German painter, of Paris and Berlin. It was one of many gifts of Van Gogh paintings by Willie to Maria, with whom he had a daughter, Lilly. Maria then married Otto Ackermann (1871–1963), an art dealer of Paris and Berlin.
- From 1919 to at least 1933 Gaston Bernheim de Villers (1870–1953) of Paris owned the painting.
- The painting was sold to Capt. Edward H. Molyneux (1891–1974) of Paris.
- It was then sold August 15, 1955 to Ailsa Mellon Bruce (1901–1969) of New York.
- In 1970 it was bequeathed to the National Gallery of Art, part of the Ailsa Mellon Bruce Collection.

Another sequence of ownership was given by J.-B. de la Faille in The Works of Vincent van Gogh, His Paintings and Drawings—a portion of which was apparently in error (i.e., Bernheim-Jeune, Reid and Lefevre, Ackermann, Molyneux.)

== See also ==
- List of works by Vincent van Gogh
