= Ivo Mršnik =

Slovenian painter, graphic artist, draughtsman and professor

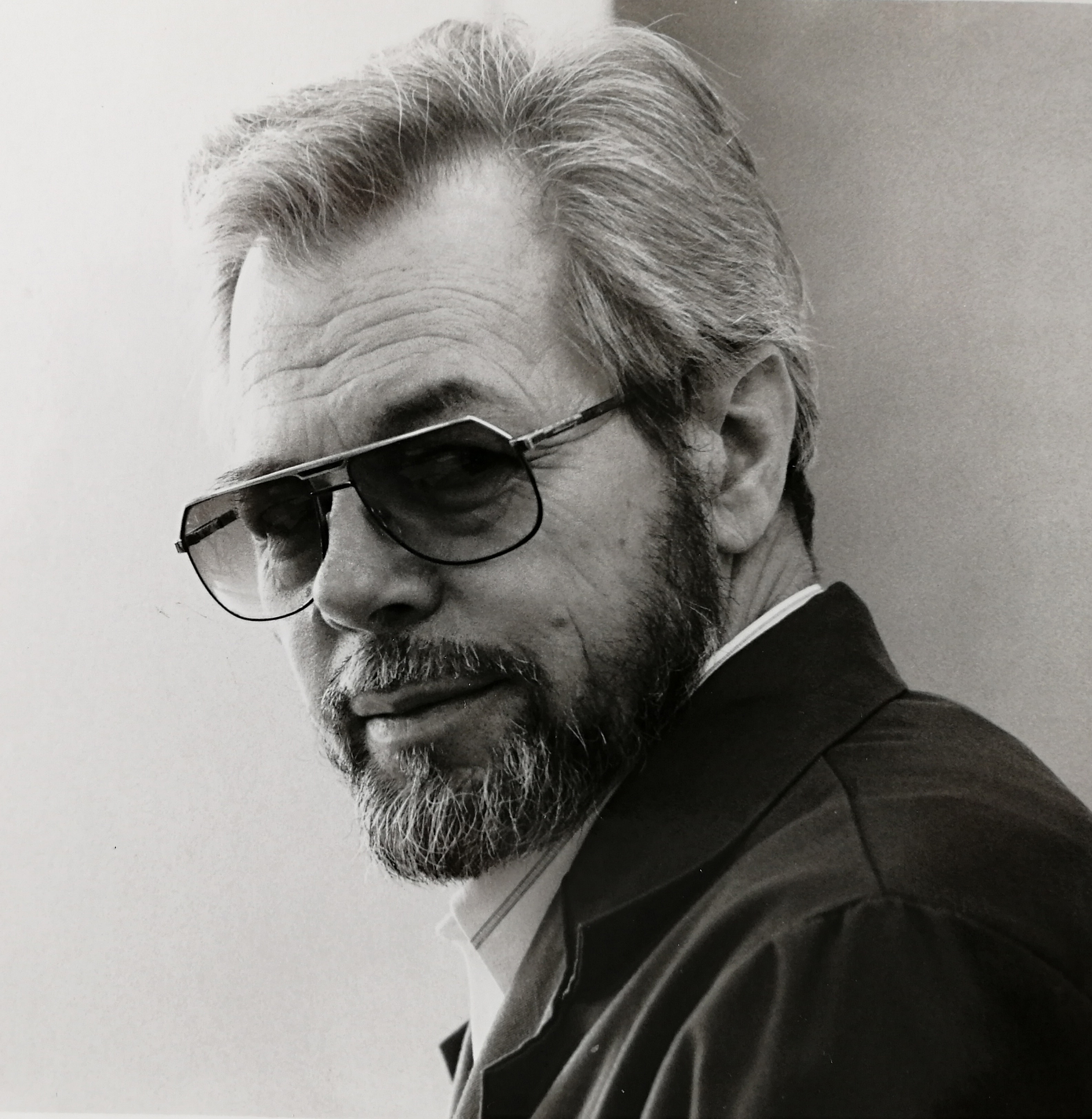
Ivo Mršnik Ivo Mršnik
- Born: June 20, 1939; Knežak, Ilirska Bistrica, Slovenia
- Education: Academy of Fine Arts, Ljubljana
- Known for: painting, graphic artist, draughtsman, professor
- Notable work: Painting and graphics
- Awards: Lifetime Achievement Award - Ivana Kobilca; Special award for contribution to world graphic creation - 10th International Triennial of Graphic Art Bitola IGT - Bitola, North Macedonia

Ivo Mršnik (20 June 1939) is a Slovenian painter, graphic artist, draughtsman and professor.

Mršnik was born in Knežak, Ilirska Bistrica, in 1939. He studied at the Ljubljana Academy of Fine Arts and has received numerous awards for his works.

== Biography ==
In 1968 he graduated from the painting department of the Academy of Fine Arts in Ljubljana, Slovenia. Since 1978 he has been working at the Faculty of Education in Ljubljana, since 1998 as a full-time professor of drawing and graphics with methodology.

Already in the 70s, Ivo Mršnik created an interesting work conceptually based on almost photorealistic drawings. Later, through a series of large portraits, his drawing was reduced to a specific minimalism that is recognizable and current in the Slovenian art scene.

Ivo Mršnik is one of the most important Slovenian painters and graphic artists. He has created numerous artistic works, especially in graphics, a work which has its persuasive significance not only in Slovenia but also abroad. His graphic sheets are part of important collections such as: Albertina, Museum Collection, Vienna, Austria, National Fund for Contemporary Art (FNAC), Paris.

The sophisticated and intimate style reflects considerable emotional and intellectual depth.

== Exhibitions ==
He has held numerous solo exhibitions, many in important galleries in Ljubljana, Kranj, Gorizia, Škofja Loka, and Koper (Capo d'Istria).

He has participated in more than one hundred group exhibitions in many world art centers.

== Awards ==
- 1969 - Prešeren Award for painting (for students)
- 1986 - Golden Diploma, 5th Yugoslav Drawings Exhibition, Tuzla Bosnia and Herzegovina
- 1986 - ransom prize, 5th Yugoslav Drawings Exhibition, Tuzla (Bosnia and Herzegovina)
- 1992 - Second Biennial of Slovenian Graphics, Novo Mesto prize for graphics, Novo Mesto
- 1992 - Selection of graphic works for Albertina, Museum Collection,Vienna, Austria
- 1992 - Selection of graphic works for the Fonds National d'Art Contemporain (FNAC), Paris
- 1993 - 1st prize for graphics Ostblock – Westbrick, Graz Austria
- 1993 - redemption prize, miniature graphic works, Maribor
- 2013 - ZDSLU (Association of Slovenian Artists). Lifetime Achievement Award
- 2017 - 1st prize at the 7th Mixed Media Exhibition, Lesedra, Bulgaria
- 2018 - Lifetime Achievement Award Ivana Kobilca
- 2021 - Special Award for Contribution to World Graphic Art - 10th International Triennial Of Graphic Art Bitola- IGT Bitola, North Macedonia

== Bibliography ==
- Ivo Mršnik, risbe in grafike; [Mednarodni grafični likovni center, Ljubljana, 2010], ISBN 9616229311, 9789616229319
- 32è Mini Print Internacional de Cadaqués 2012; 32è Mini Print Internacional de Cadaqués 2012, 2013. [na spletu], Katalog
- Nazaj v prihodnost: eseji o slikarstvu , by Tomaž Gorjup, Ivo Mršnik, Unknown, 206 Pages, Published 2015, ISBN 9789612531744
- Likovno izražanje: učbenik za 6. razred osnovne šole , by Tonka Tacol, Črtomir Frelih, Jožef Muhovič, Domen Zupančič, Ivo Mršnik, Oto Vogrin, Črtomir Mihelj Unknown, 116 Pages, Published 2013, ISBN 961-6525-78-6 / 9616525786
