= Absolute metaphor =

The term absolute metaphor describes the special case of a metaphor that has become independent of the facts it illustrates. It was coined by the German philosopher Hans Blumenberg in the context of his collaboration on the project of history of concepts (German: Begriffsgeschichte).

Blumenberg adopted from Immanuel Kant the phrase describing the relation between the physical world and the Unknown (similar to the one between an artifact and its designer), modifying it as the "transfer of reflection on an object of intuition to a completely different concept, to which perhaps no intuition can ever directly correspond." For example, "world is a theater" (theatrum mundi) is an absolute metaphor as it is supposed to compare an ‘impossible-to-define ‘concept ("world") to an apparently unrelated one ("theater").

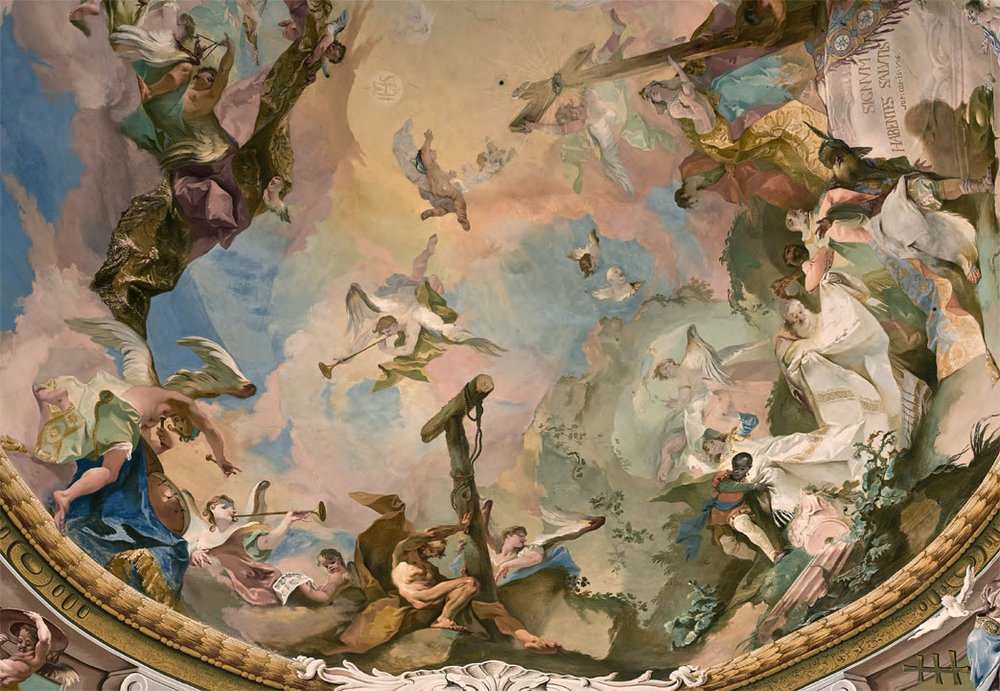
The phrase "world is a theater" is an absolute metaphor

== Significance ==
Within rhetorical theory, an absolute metaphor is strictly a contradictio in adiecto (a contradiction in terms). For Blumenberg, metaphors are "absolute" when "they prove resistant to the terminological claim, cannot be resolved into concepts." According to the traditional understanding of metaphors, this resolution must be in principle possible, as metaphors merely serve to embellish a speech (decorum) or, especially in science, to provide illustrative clarification.

In contrast, Blumenberg argues that an absolute metaphor can come to influence, if not dominate, the entire theory formation of the subject it illustrates. He demonstrated, for example, that the metaphor of "light" has been of paradigmatic importance for theories of "truth" since antiquity. This includes the metaphysical opposition of Being (light) and Non-Being (darkness), as well as the methodologically reflective (and thus recognized as a metaphor) illustration of subjective truth (lumen naturale).

Absolute metaphors tend to occupy the semantic field of concepts that lack immediate, sensory intuition. Following Kant, Blumenberg calls such concepts Ideas. These include "truth," "freedom," "state," "world," "life," or "history." They are concepts that "overwhelm" the normal process of judgment or are used in "drastic" situations that require "quick orientation." The exemplary case of an absolute metaphor is thus a tangible image for an object that fundamentally eludes any visualization. Unlike scientific terminology, which aims for clear definition, absolute metaphors structure the "lifeworld" (Lebenswelt).

== Metaphor and concept ==
Absolute metaphors are understood as (makeshift) intuitions for (in-principle un-intuitive) Ideas. As such, they are part of the "substructures of thought." Blumenberg describes them as the "ground" or "nutrient solution" (German: Nährlösung) from which "systematic crystallizations" — that is, concepts — emerge.

Blumenberg emphasizes the (at least anthropological) necessity of this "metaphorical external determination." The metaphor functions as a "placeholder for the Idea," which refers to the "totality of possible experience" and can therefore never be fully "brought to the concept." There is a "vacancy of the concept, which only the imagination can fill."

This makes the use of such metaphors both essential and precarious. While the abstraction from these images leads to a mystification of the concept, an uncritical surrender to the associative flood of images leads to a naive, pre-rational way of thinking. Blumenberg saw a "double hyperbole" at play: "The concept ends in mysticism, the metaphor in myth."

== Sources ==
- Blumenberg, Hans (1960). Paradigmen zu einer Metaphorologie [Paradigms for a Metaphorology] (in German). Bonn.
- Blumenberg, Hans (2007). Haverkamp, Anselm (ed.). Theorie der Unbegrifflichkeit [Theory of Inconceptuality] (in German). Frankfurt/M.: Suhrkamp. ISBN 978-3-518-58480-4.
- Quiring, Björn (2014). "Introduction" (PDF). In Quiring, Björn (ed.). 'If Then the World a Theatre Present ...': Revisions of the Theatrum Mundi Metaphor in Early Modern England. Pluralisierung & Autorität. Vol. 32. Berlin/Boston: De Gruyter. pp. 1–24. ISBN 978-3-11-029229-9. ISSN 2076-8281.
- Zill, Rüdiger (2002). "»Substrukturen des Denkens«. Grenzen und Perspektiven einer Metaphorologie nach Hans Blumenberg" ["Substructures of Thought". Limits and Perspectives of a History of Metaphor according to Hans Blumenberg]. In Bödeker, Hans Erich (ed.). Begriffsgeschichte, Diskursgeschichte, Metapherngeschichte [History of Concepts, History of Discourse, History of Metaphor] (in German). Göttingen: Wallstein-Verl. pp. 211–257. ISBN 3-89244-470-6.
