= Hans Blumenberg =

German philosopher and intellectual historian (1920–1996)

Hans Blumenberg (German: [ˈbluːmənˌbɛʁk]; 13 July 1920, Lübeck – 28 March 1996, Altenberge) was a German philosopher and intellectual historian who studied philosophy, German studies, and the classics (1939–47, interrupted by World War II).

He created metaphorology, theorizing that what lies under metaphors and language modisms is closer to truth and further from ideology. His last works, especially Care Crosses the River, are attempts to apprehend human reality through metaphors and involuntary expressions. Digging under apparently meaningless anecdotes of the history of occidental thought and literature, he mapped expressions, examples, and gestures that flourished in discussions of greater matters. His readings were idiosyncratic and full of signs, indications, and suggestions, sometimes ironic, to warn against the force of revealed truth and for the beauty of a world in confusion.

== Life ==
Hans Blumenberg finished his university entrance exam in 1939 at the Katharineum zu Lübeck, as the only student receiving the grade Auszeichnung ("Distinguished"). But, being labelled a "half-Jew", considering that his mother was Jewish, the Catholic Blumenberg was barred from continuing his theology studies. Instead, between 1939 and 1941 he was to pursue his studies of philosophy at the theological universities in Paderborn and Frankfurt, where he was forced to leave towards the end of this period. Back in Lübeck he was enrolled in the workforce at the Drägerwerk AG. In 1944 Blumenberg was detained in a Nazi concentration camp, but was released after the intercession of Heinrich Dräger, the founder of Drägerwerk AG. At the end of the war he was kept hidden by the family of his future wife Ursula. Blumenberg greatly despised the years which he claimed had been stolen from him by the Nazis. His friend Odo Marquard reports that after the war, Blumenberg slept only six times a week in order to make up for lost time. Consequently, the theme of finite life and limited time as a hurdle for scholasticism recurs frequently in Part 2 of The Legitimacy of the Modern Age (German: Die Legitimität der Neuzeit, 1966). After 1945 Blumenberg continued his studies of philosophy, Germanistics and classical philology at the University of Hamburg, and graduated in 1947 with a doctoral dissertation on the origin of the ontology of the Middle Ages, at the University of Kiel. He received the postdoctoral habilitation in 1950, with a dissertation on Ontological Distance, an Inquiry into the Crisis of Edmund Husserl's Phenomenology (Die ontologische Distanz: Eine Untersuchung über die Krisis der Phänomenologie Husserls). His supervisor for both his doctorate and habilitation was Ludwig Landgrebe. During Blumenberg's lifetime he was a member of the Senate of the German Research Foundation, a professor at several universities in Germany and a joint founder of the research group Poetics and Hermeneutics.

He died on 28 March 1996 in Altenberge (near Münster), Germany.

== Work ==
Blumenberg's work was of a predominantly historical nature, characterised by his great philosophical and theological learning, and by the precision and pointedness of his writing style. The early text Paradigms for a Metaphorology (German: Paradigmen zu einer Metaphorologie, 1960) explicates the idea of absolute metaphors, by way of examples from the history of ideas and philosophy. According to Blumenberg, metaphors of this kind, such as "the naked truth", are to be considered a fundamental aspect of philosophical discourse that cannot be replaced by concepts and thus brought back essentially to logic. The distinctness and meaning of these metaphors constitute the perception of reality as a whole, a necessary prerequisite for human orientation, thought and action. For Blumenberg, "That these metaphors are called 'absolute' means only that they prove resistant to terminological claims and cannot be dissolved into conceptuality, not that one metaphor could not be replaced or represented by another, or corrected through a more precise one. Even absolute metaphors therefore have a history". The founding idea of this first text was further developed in works on the metaphors of light in theories of knowledge, of being in navigation (Shipwreck with Spectator, 1979) and the metaphors of books and reading. (The Legibility of the World, 1979.)

In Blumenberg's many inquiries into the history of philosophy the threshold of the late Middle Ages and the early Renaissance provides a focal point (Legitimacy of the Modern Age and The Genesis of the Copernican World). Inspired by (amongst others) Ernst Cassirer's functional perspective on the history of ideas and philosophy, and the concomitant view of a rearrangement within the spiritual relationships specific to an epoch, Blumenberg rejects the substantialism of historical continuity — fundamental to the so-called "theorem of secularisation" – according to which the conceptual systems of modernity are not considered something new, but a simple becoming mundane of the theological principles of Scholasticism. Instead, the Modern age in Blumenberg's view represents an independent epoch opposed to Antiquity and the Middle Ages by a rehabilitation of human curiosity in reaction to theological absolutism. "Hans Blumenberg targets Karl Löwith's argument that progress is the secularisation of Hebrew and Christian beliefs and argues to the contrary that the modern age, including its belief in progress, grew out of a new secular self-affirmation of culture against the Christian tradition." Wolfhart Pannenberg, a student of Löwith, has continued the debate against Blumenberg.

In his later works (Work on Myth, Out of the Cave) Blumenberg, guided by Arnold Gehlen's view of man as a frail and finite being in need of certain auxiliary ideas in order to face the "Absolutism of Reality" and its overwhelming power, increasingly underlined the anthropological background of his ideas: he treated myth and metaphor as a functional equivalent to the distancing, orientational and relieving value of institutions as understood by Gehlen. This context is of decisive importance for Blumenberg's idea of absolute metaphors. Whereas metaphors originally were a means of illustrating the reality of an issue, giving form to understanding, they were later to tend towards a separate existence, in the sciences as elsewhere. This phenomenon may range from the attempt to fully explicate the metaphor while losing sight of its illustrative function, to the experience of becoming immersed in metaphors influencing the seeming logicality of conclusions. The idea of 'absolute metaphors' turns out to be of decisive importance for the ideas of a culture, such as the metaphor of light as truth in Neo-Platonism, to be found in the hermeneutics of Martin Heidegger and Hans-Georg Gadamer. The critical history of concepts may thus serve the depotentiation of metaphorical power. Blumenberg did, however, also warn his readers not to confound the critical deconstruction of myth with the programmatical belief in the overcoming of any mythology. Reflecting his studies of Husserl, Blumenberg's work concludes that in the last resort our potential scientific enlightenment finds its own subjective and anthropological limit in the fact that we are constantly falling back upon the imagery of our contemplations.

== Works ==
Hans Blumenberg is the author of:

- (1947) Contributions to the problem of the originality of the medieval-scholastic ontology (doctoral thesis, unpublished).
- (1950) The ontological distance. An investigation into the crisis of Husserl's phenomenology (habilitation thesis, unpublished).
- (1966) The Legitimacy of the Modern Age
- (1975) The Genesis of the Copernican World
- (1979) The Legibility of the World
- (1979) Work on Myth
- (1986) Lifetime and world time
- (1987) Care Crosses the River
- (1993) St Matthew Passion
- (2007) Der Mann vom Mond

=== Works in English translation ===
- The Readability of the World. Trans. Robert Savage and David Roberts. Ithaca, Cornell University Press, 2022. ISBN 978-1-5017-6661-9.
- St. Matthew Passion. Trans. Helmut Müller-Sievers and Paul Fleming. Ithaca, Cornell University Press, 2021. ISBN 978-1-5017-0580-9.
- History, Metaphors, Fables: A Hans Blumenberg Reader. Ed. and trans. Hannes Bajohr, Florian Fuchs, and Joe Paul Kroll. Ithaca, Cornell University Press, 2020. ISBN 978-1-5017-4798-4.
- Lions. Trans. Kári Driscoll. London, Seagull Books, 2018. ISBN 978-0-85742-430-3
- Rigorism of Truth: "Moses the Egyptian" and Other Writings on Freud and Arendt. Trans. Joe Paul Kroll. Ithaca, Cornell University Press, 2018. ISBN 978-1-5017-1672-0
- The Laughter of the Thracian Woman: A Protohistory of Theory. Trans. Spencer Hawkins. New York, Bloomsbury Academic, 2015. ISBN 978-1-6235-6230-4
- Care Crosses the River. Trans. Paul Fleming. Stanford, Stanford University Press, 2010. ISBN 978-0-8047-3580-3
- Paradigms for a Metaphorology. Trans. Robert Savage. Ithaca, Cornell University Press, 2010. ISBN 978-0-8014-4925-3
- "Does It Matter When? On Time Indifference", Philosophy and Literature 22 (1): 212–218 (1998). Trans. David Adams.
- Shipwreck with Spectator: Paradigm of a Metaphor for Existence. Trans. Steven Rendall. Cambridge, MIT Press, 1996. ISBN 978-0-262-02411-2
- "Light as a Metaphor for Truth: At the Preliminary Stage of Philosophical Concept Formation", in Modernity and the Hegemony of Vision, ed. David Michael Levin, University of California, Berkeley, 1993, pp. 30–86. Trans. Joel Anderson.
- "Being – A MacGuffin: How to Preserve the Desire to Think", Salmagundi No. 90/91 (Spring-Summer 1991), pp. 191–193. Trans. David Adams.
- "An Anthropological Approach to the Contemporary Significance of Rhetoric", in After Philosophy: End or Transformation?, eds. Kenneth Baynes, James Bohman, and Thomas McCarthy, MIT Press, Cambridge, 1987, pp. 423–458. Trans. Robert M. Wallace.
- The Genesis of the Copernican World. Trans. Robert M. Wallace. Cambridge, MIT Press, 1987. ISBN 978-0-262-52144-4
- The Legitimacy of the Modern Age. Trans. Robert M. Wallace. Cambridge, MIT Press, 1985. ISBN 978-0-262-52105-5
- Work on Myth. Trans. Robert M. Wallace. Cambridge, MIT Press, 1985. ISBN 978-0-262-52133-8
- "To Bring Myth to an End", New German Critique 32 (1984), 109–140. Trans. Robert M. Wallace. [Chapter from Work on Myth.]
- "Self-Preservation and Inertia: On the Constitution of Modern Rationality", Contemporary German Philosophy 3 (1983), 209–256.
- "The Concept of Reality and the Possibility of the Novel", in New Perspectives in German Literary Criticism: A Collection of Essays, ed. Richard E. Amacher and Victor Lange, Princeton, Princeton University Press, 1979, pp. 29–48. Trans. David Henry Wilson.
- "On a Lineage of the Idea of Progress", Social Research 41 No. 1 (1974): 5–27. Trans. E.B. Ashton.
- "The Life-World and the Concept of Reality", in Life-World and Consciousness: Essays for Aron Gurwitsch, ed. Lester E. Embree, Evanston, Northwestern University, 1972
