= Der Mann vom Mond =

2007 book by Hans Blumenberg

- Editor: Alexander Schmitz; Marcel Lepper
- Author: Hans Blumenberg
- Language: German
- Subject: Ernst Jünger
- Publisher: Suhrkamp Verlag
- Publication date: 9 October 2007
- Publication place: Germany
- Pages: 186
- ISBN: 978-3-518-58483-5

Der Mann vom Mond. Über Ernst Jünger (lit. 'The Man from the Moon: On Ernst Jünger') is a book by the German philosopher Hans Blumenberg, compiled from texts Blumenberg wrote about the writer Ernst Jünger. It was edited by Alexander Schmitz and Marcel Lepper and published by Suhrkamp Verlag in 2007.

== Summary ==
The book consists of texts the philosopher Hans Blumenberg (1920 – 1996) wrote about the writer Ernst Jünger throughout his career. Blumenberg was affected by Jünger's observations and commented on his works and approach to the world. Blumenberg regarded Jünger's way of thinking as something that approached a philosophical or religious programme but stopped short of actually becoming one. Der Mann vom Mond includes previously published texts, such as articles Blumenberg wrote for Jünger's 60th and 100th birthdays, as well as unpublished personal notes, where Blumenberg sometimes used a passage from Jünger as the starting point for essayistic ponderings that eventually ventured far away from Jünger's writings.

== Reception ==
Kai Köhler of Literaturkritik.de wrote that in the later published works, Blumenberg became more critical of Jünger, but in the private, previously unpublished writings, he retained the same admiration as in his early publications.
