= Bruce Ross =

Canadian poet

Bruce Ross is a Canadian American poet, author, philosopher, humanities educator and past president of the Haiku Society of America. He was born in Hamilton, Ontario.

Ross has taught Japanese poetry (in translation) and painting forms for many years at a number of institutions, including Empire State College, Burlington College, the University of Vermont, the University of Alberta, and the University of Maine. He has lectured on haiku in the United States, Canada, Japan, the Netherlands, Sweden, and Romania. His anthologies and instructional books are in numerous libraries.

Ross's original English language haiku, senryū, haibun, tanka, haiga, and collaborative renku have appeared in international haiku journals, as have his reviews and articles. He is known for defining haiku as an "absolute metaphor" and as a "haiku moment." His spring clouds haiku won both a Haiku Society of America Merit Book Award (2013) as well as the World Haiku Club R.H. Blyth Award (2013).

Ross has taught undergraduate and graduate courses in humanities, including religion, critical theory, philosophy, poetics, world literature, mythology, and related subjects. Ross has lectured and published in phenomenology, most recently Traveling to Other Worlds, Lectures on Transpersonal Expression in Literature and the Arts (2012), and for many years published his essays on philosophy and aesthetics in Analecta Husserliana. He has also taught related graduate independent study in the humanities.

Ross is the owner of Tancho Press, specializing in haiku related books.

He lives with his wife Astrid in Hampden, Maine.

== Bibliography ==
=== Poetry ===
- Thousands of Wet Stones. M.A.F. Portlandville New York (1988)
- The Trees. The Plowman Whitby Ontario (1991)
- among floating duckweed. HMS Press London Ontario (1994)
- SILENCE: COLLECTED HAIKU. HMS Press London Ontario (1997)
- summer drizzles... haiku and haibun. HMS Press London Ontario (2005)
- endless small waves. HMS Press London Ontario (2008)
- spring clouds haiku. Tancho Press Bangor Maine (2012)

=== Non-fiction ===
- The Inheritance of Animal Symbols in Modern Literature and World Culture. Peter Lang (1988)
- If Not Higher, Lectures on the Poetics of Spiritual Presence and Absence. Peter Lang (1999)
- How to Haiku, A Writer's Guide to Haiku and Related Forms. Tuttle (2002)
- Venturing upon Dizzy Heights, Lectures and Essays on Philosophy, Literature, and the Arts. Peter Lang (2008)
- Traveling to Other Worlds, Lectures on Transpersonal Expression in Literature and the Arts. Peter Lang (2012)

=== Anthologies edited ===
- Haiku Moment, An Anthology of Contemporary North American Haiku (1993)
- Journey to the Interior: American Versions of Haibun (1998)
- scent of pine: A Maine Haiku Anthology (2011)
- A VAST SKY, An Anthology of Contemporary World Haiku (2015) (co-editors: Koko Kato, Dietmar Tauchner, Patricia Prime)
