= Theatrum Mundi =

Metaphorical concept

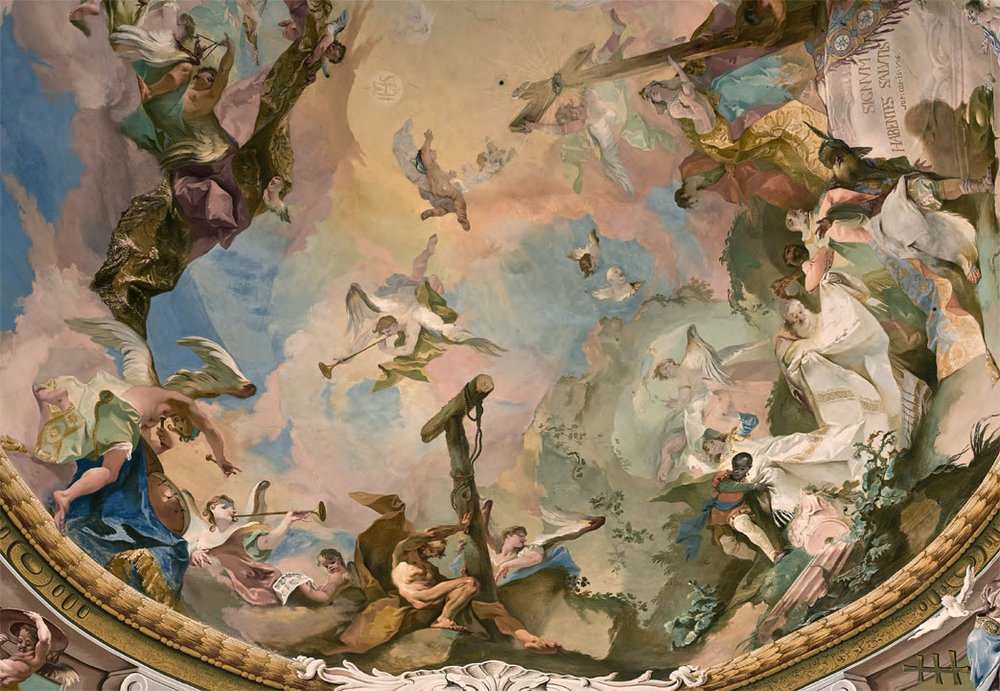
Theatrum mundi.

The theater of the world (or theatrum mundi, coined in the 12th century by John of Salisbury) is an "absolute metaphor" relating the real life and a theater. In a circular way, it can be either used to describe the world as a theater stage (cf. "all the world's a stage" by Shakespeare), or to describe the stage as a representation of the world. This flexibility of the phrase has contributed to its longevity, allowing it to be used by groups with very different religious or political views, even to express anti-theatrical positions. The metaphor can frame life as either tragic or comic, and as either rigidly structured or entirely chaotic.

== Flexible meaning ==
The very absoluteness of this metaphor allows great flexibility in its interpretation, with dualities abound:

- It can suggest that life is "predetermined" and follows a set script or, conversely, an improvisation where anything is possible;
- It can suggest the stability of life by positing an omnipotent director who controls the action. Or, it can highlight life's contingency and fragility, portraying it as a "constant flux of roles, players and plots".
- The metaphor can also imply that the world is completely visible, or it can suggest that a more essential and fundamental reality is hidden "behind the scenes". In this way, the theatre is presented as a place of both special insight and total illusion.

A significant aspect of the metaphor is its influence in the development of sociology and political science, possibly being instrumental in the evolition of modern concepts of the "role" and "person".

== History ==
=== Antiquity ===
The metaphor originated in philosophy, not in the theatre itself. Already c. 500 BC, Heraclitus offered a view that compared the world to figures on a board game moved by a boy. The idea is also apparent in Plato's Allegory of the Cave. The metaphor became prominent in late antiquity, particularly in Stoicism and Neoplatonism. Thinkers like Seneca the Younger and Marcus Aurelius used it to argue for a philosophical acceptance of Fate, which they saw as the "director" of the world's play. Plotinus in his Enneads multiple times uses the theater analogy to stress the lightness of the world (as compared to the soul).

=== Christianity ===
Early Christianity adapted the trope to direct focus away from the world and toward God. Church Fathers like St. Augustine and John Chrysostom employed the metaphor, often casting God as the writer, director, and audience of the cosmic play.

The specific term theatrum mundi was coined in the 12th century by John of Salisbury. He commented that saints "despise the theater of this world from the heights of their virtue". In several chapters of the third book of his Policraticus, a moral encyclopedia, he stressed that "the life of man on earth is a comedy, where each forgetting his own plays another's role". The comedy takes place on the scene/in the world, while the auditorium is associated with the Christian paradise. Only a few sages, like some Stoic philosophers or the prophets like Abraham or John the Baptist, are able to accept the role given by God. This acceptation allows them to extract themselves from the theatrum mundi, to adopt a celestial position in the auditorium, and to watch and understand the roles played in the comedy.

=== Early modern ===
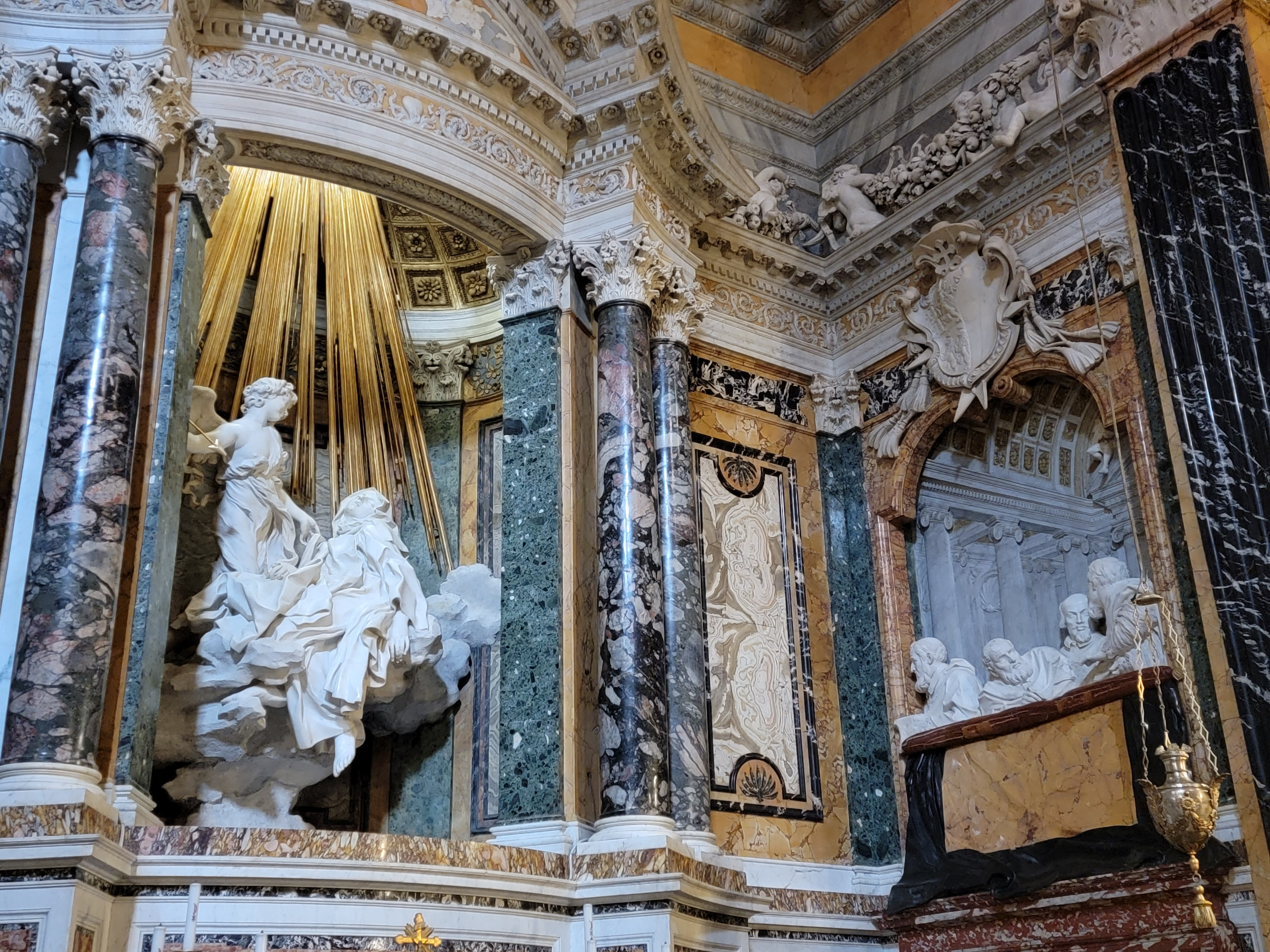
A scene of ecstasy of Saint Teresa, witnessed by the members of the Cornaro family (Gianlorenzo Bernini, 1652)

The metaphor was a popular idea in the Baroque Period. Highlighting the duality of the metaphor in 1637, Gianlorenzo Bernini produced a play in Rome with symmetrical arrangement of real spectators and the staged ones. Two actors addressed audiences, each trying to convince his listeners that the group they are seeing across the stage is merely an illusion.

The metaphor's use peaked around 1600, especially in England. It became a "general commonplace" and was central to the work of playwrights like Shakespeare. In this era, the metaphor's religious meaning was often subdued; for instance, Shakespeare's "All the world's a stage" speech in As You Like It operates on a "purely immanent level," lacking any reference to transcendent powers.

In 1638 Dutch poet Joost van den Vondel wrote as an inscription for the gate of the newly built Amsterdamse Schouwburg (Europe's first theater out of stone):"De wereld is een speeltoneel, elk speelt zijn rol en krijgt zijn deel". (English: "The world's a stage, each plays his part and gets his share.")

The use of the phrase declined in the 18th-19th century, coinciding with the lessening of the theater's role as mass media.

=== Modern ===
The metaphor saw a revival in the 20th century, where it was critically re-examined by influential dramatists such as Brecht, Beckett, and Artaud. Also notable are contribution by Situationists and Jean Baudrillard.

The metaphor had influenced the development of sociology and political science. Plato described his ideal state's constitution as an "imitation of the fairest and best life," effectively a type of "permanent performance" by the state. This idea was later used in the early modern period to represent the state as the one "true theatre" of human life, possibly being instrumental in transfer of theatrical terms into the modern meanings of the "role" and "person", due to Hobbes.

The critique of theatricality in social life was approached (from different angles) by Marx, Nietzsche, and Freud.

== Sources ==
- Gillies, John (1994). Shakespeare and the Geography of Difference. Cambridge Studies in Renaissance Literature and Culture. Vol. 4. Cambridge University Press. pp. 76–77. ISBN 9780521458535.
- Hoffmeister, Gerhart (March 2009). "World as a Stage - Theatrum Mundi". The Literary Encyclopedia.
- Quiring, Björn (2014). "Introduction" (PDF). In Quiring, Björn (ed.). 'If Then the World a Theatre Present ...': Revisions of the Theatrum Mundi Metaphor in Early Modern England. Pluralisierung & Autorität. Vol. 32. Berlin/Boston: De Gruyter. pp. 1–24. ISBN 978-3-11-029229-9. ISSN 2076-8281.
