= Cornelia Schorer =

German psychiatrist

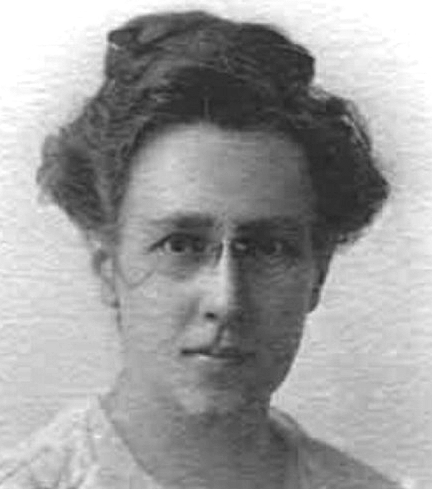
Cornelia Schorer (1890s)

Cornelia Bernhardine Johanna Schorer (12 July 1863 – 9 January 1939) was a German physician. As one of the first women in Germany to study medicine, she became the first female doctor in Lübeck. Most of her professional life was spent as a psychiatrist in the United States.

== Biography ==
She was born in Lübeck to the pharmacist and politician, Theodor Schorer, and had five siblings. Her younger sister, Maria, became an Impressionist painter, under the name Maria Slavona. She was the oldest daughter. She spent two years at the Roquettesches privates Lehrerinnenseminar, when it was the only school in Lübeck that offered professional training to women. She passed her examination in 1882.

She stayed in Lübeck, teaching French and German at the Ernestinenschule], where she was officially a "scientific assistant". In 1889, she went to Berlin to attend a private school for women, operated by the feminist, Helene Lange. From 1891 to 1892, she began studying philosophy at the University of Zurich, then switched to medicine. She received her doctorate in 1897, with a dissertation; "Clinical Reports on Chlorosis". After that, she worked as a doctor in the dermatology clinic at Charles University in Prague.

In 1899, she emigrated to the United States, settled in Massachusetts, and was certified as a doctor. From 1901 to 1908, when an illness prevented her from performing her usual work, she became a psychiatrist at Worcester State Hospital. After a year's stay in Germany for an operation and recovery, in Munich, she returned to Worcester and worked there until 1914. She then transferred to Boston State Hospital, where she was involved in a study of mentally ill women who had run afoul of the law. In 1920, she transferred again, to Foxborough State Hospital, becoming a Senior Resident.

In 1933, she retired and returned to Germany. She also travelled extensively, and came back to the United States for a short visit in 1935. She died in 1939 in Potsdam.

The city of Lübeck has named a street after her in the new Hochschulstadtteil (University District). In 2005, her life's work was celebrated as part of an exhibition, "Women in the History of Lübeck".
