= Alois Erdtelt =

German painter and teacher (1851–1911)

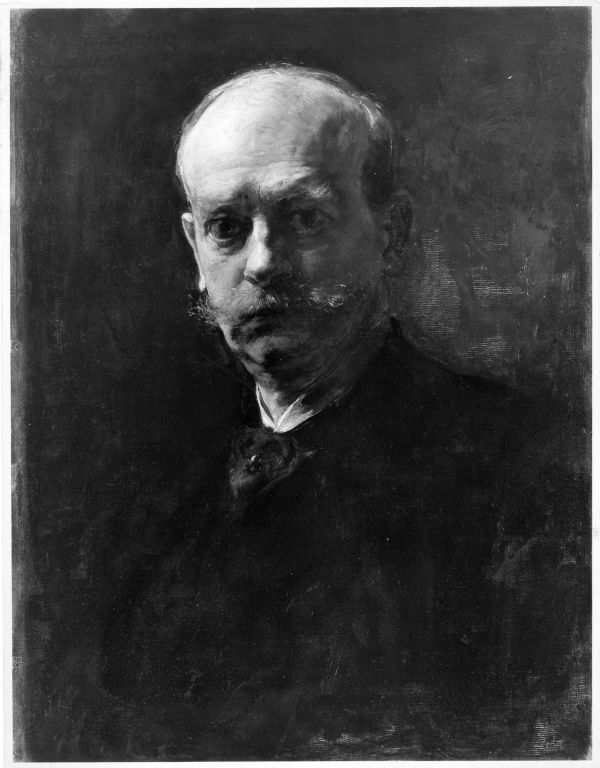
Self-portrait of Erdtelt from 1903

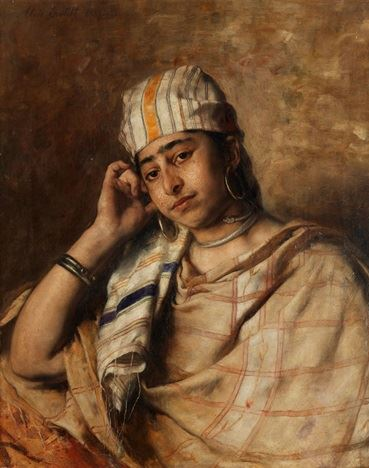
Olga Maria von Hoenika in an Oriental costume

Alois Erdtelt (5 November 1851 – 18 January 1911) was a German portrait painter and art teacher.

== Life and work ==
He was born in Herzogswalde. His father was a tenant farmer. Thanks to the patronage of Oswald von Hoenika, the Rittergutsbesitzer (Lord of the manor) in Herzogswalde, Erdtelt was able to attend the Berlin University of the Arts, where he studied with Carl Steffeck. After 1876, he completed his studies at the Academy of Fine Arts, Munich, with Wilhelm von Diez.

He remained in Munich and, until 1889, operated a private painting school for women. His students included Rosa Pfäffinger, Maria Slavona, Ida Gerhardi, Ivana Kobilca and Hedwig Weiß, among many others. After 1889, he taught at the Königliche Kunstgewerbeschule. On several occasions, he exhibited his works at the Glaspalast. He also had showings abroad; in Paris, London and at the Louisiana Purchase Exposition in St.Louis.

His works may be seen at the Neue Pinakothek, as well as at museums in Hanover and Kaliningrad (formerly Königsberg).

== Sources ==
- "Erdtelt, Alois". In: Ulrich Thieme (Ed.): Allgemeines Lexikon der Bildenden Künstler von der Antike bis zur Gegenwart, Vol.10: Dubolon–Erlwein. E. A. Seemann, Leipzig 1914, pg.594 (Online)
- Karl-Ernst Schellhammer: "Professor Alois Erdtelt". In: Heimat-Kalender des Kreises Grottkau 1931. Oppeln 1930, pp. 79–80.
- Horst Ludwig: "Ernst Zimmermann, Alois Erdtelt und Adolf Echtler. Münchner Maler der Gründerzeit. Wilhelm Diez und seine Schule". In: Weltkunst 50, 1980, pp. 1024–1026.
- Susanna Partsch: "Erdtelt, Alois". In: Allgemeines Künstlerlexikon, Vol.34, Saur, 2002, ISBN 3-598-22774-4, pg.302
