= Lumen naturale =

Lumen naturale (Latin for "natural light") is a term derived from ancient light metaphysics for the finite cognitive faculty of man (subjective truth), in contrast to the supernatural, divine light (lumen supranaturale). The lumen naturale "illuminates" only the elementary logical and empirical truths, as man can only attain higher knowledge through revelation.

Cicero was likely the first to use the expression in his Tusculanae disputationes, calling it lumen naturae. For Augustine, the Word of God is the actual true light that illuminates the whole person. In the Christian faith, the lumen naturale is given by God. In contrast, according to René Descartes, the lumen naturale is an innate property of man to recognize truth intuitively and thus reason.

== Sources ==
- Toellner, Richard (1984). "Zum Begriff der Autorität in der Medizin der Renaissance" [On the Concept of Authority in Renaissance Medicine]. In Schmitz, Rudolf; Keil, Gundolf (eds.). Humanismus und Medizin [Humanism and Medicine]. Deutsche Forschungsgemeinschaft: Mitteilungen der Kommission für Humanismusforschung (in German). Vol. 11. Weinheim. pp. 159–179. ISBN 3-527-17011-1.
