= Willy Gretor =

Danish painter and art dealer

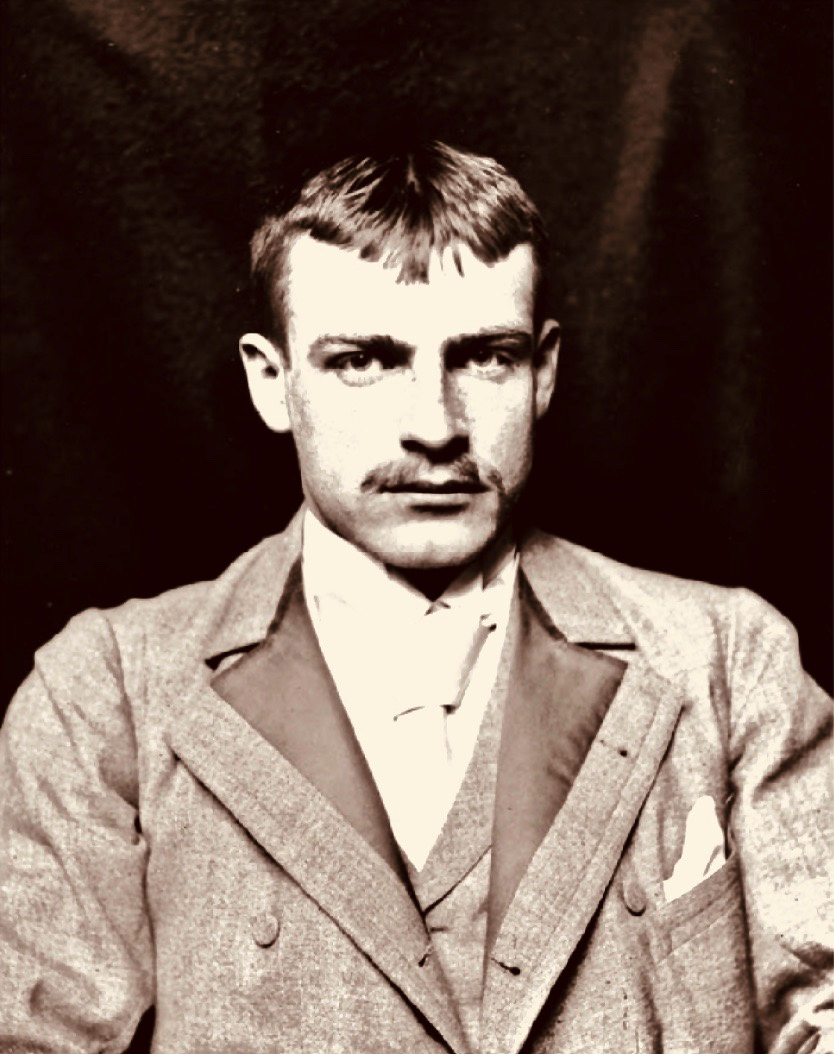
Willy Gretor (c.1895)

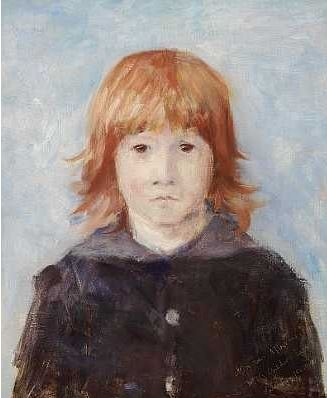
Portrait of a Redhaired Boy

Willy Gretor, born Vilhelm Rudolf Julius Petersen (16 July 1868, in Wundlacken Castle, near Königsberg – 31 July 1923, in Copenhagen), was a Danish painter and art dealer, who spent most of his life in Germany and Paris.

== Life and work ==
His father, Hans Christian Petersen, was a merchant from Flensburg. He had his first art lessons in Copenhagen, from Niels Pedersen Mols and Bertha Wegmann, at the Royal Danish Academy of Fine Arts. In 1889, he went to Lübeck. There, he became acquainted with members of the "Ibsenklub" (named after the playwright, Henrik Ibsen); a group of liberal young people who met to exchange ideas, about modern literature that had an aura of "mystery and scandal".

Based on his correspondence, this led to a brief affair with Margarethe Gütschow, who later became an archaeologist, and an equally brief engagement to one of her cousins. This network of relationships also led to a group trip to Paris, during which he began an affair with the painter, Maria Schorer. For unknown reasons, they decided to take assumed names for their artworks. Maria became Maria Slavona, and he chose the name Willy Gretor. The actress known as Lilly Ackermann was born from this liaison.

From 1890 to 1891, he held several exhibitions in Paris, which led him to his next affair, with the painter, Rosa Pfäffinger. This time, however, the affair became marriage. One of their children was the journalist, Georg Gretor.

He then largely gave up painting to work as an art dealer in England, France and Spain. In that capacity, he was involved as a middleman in the controversial sale of the wax bust, Flora, which was purchased by the Bode Museum in Berlin, from the English art dealer Murray Marks (1840-1918), in the belief that it was by Da Vinci. Its true authorship has yet to be established to everyone's satisfaction.

For a short time, Frank Wedekind was Gretor's secretary. It is generally assumed that Gretor served as the prototype for the title character in Wedekind's play, The Marquis of Keith.
