= Maria Slavona =

German painter

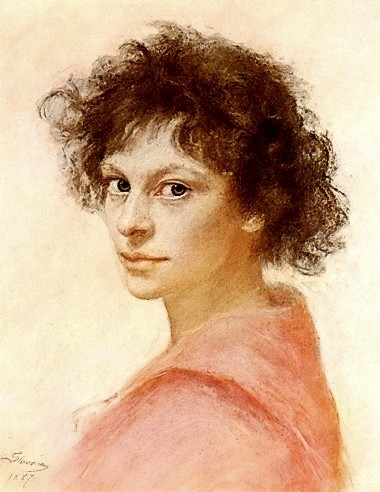
Self-portrait (1887)

Maria Slavona, born Marie Dorette Caroline Schorer (14 March 1865, Lübeck - 10 May 1931, Berlin) was a German impressionist painter.

== Life ==
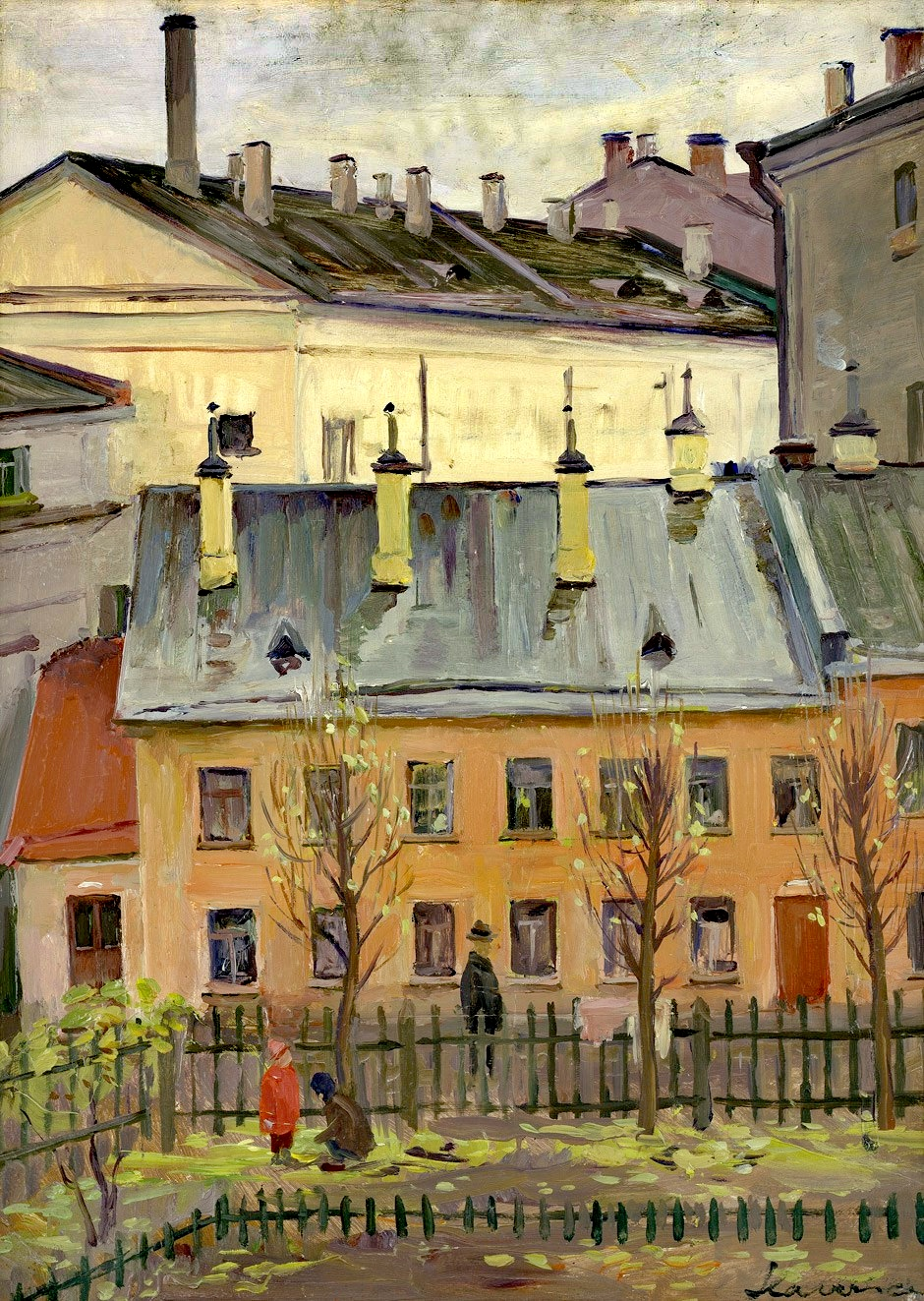
Houses on Montmartre (1898)

Her father, Theodor Schorer, was a pharmacist and politician who was known for his campaign to improve the quality of Lübeck's drinking water. Her oldest sister, Cornelia Schorer, became one of the first female doctors in Germany. At the age of seventeen, after some informal lessons in painting and drawing, she went to Berlin to study at a private art school before moving on to the teaching institute at the Museum of Decorative Arts, which she attended until 1886. The following year, she began studies at the Verein der Berliner Künstlerinnen, an art school for women, where they were allowed to study anatomy and draw from live models. The official Prussian Academy of Art was still a male-only institution at that time.

In 1888, she moved to Munich, taking private lessons from the portrait painter Alois Erdtelt, then attending the Münchner Künstlerinnenverein Women's Academy, where her most influential teacher was Ludwig von Herterich, who introduced her to impressionism. Later, on a holiday back home, she met some Scandinavian artists and travelled to Paris with them but, except for the Louvre, was rather disappointed.

=== First successes ===
One of her companions on the trip was the Danish painter Vilhelm Petersen and, as they became closer friends, they both decided to take assumed names for their artworks. He chose Willy Gretor and she became Maria Slavona. They also had an illegitimate daughter who later became an actress under the name Lilly Ackermann, after the man her mother married in 1900, the Swiss art dealer Otto Ackermann (1871-1963). Slavona's first exhibit came in 1893 at the Salon de Champ-de-Mars of the Société Nationale des Beaux-Arts, ironically under the male pseudonym "Carl-Maria Plavona". In 1901, she joined the Berlin Secession, returned to Lübeck in 1906 and came back to Berlin in 1909.

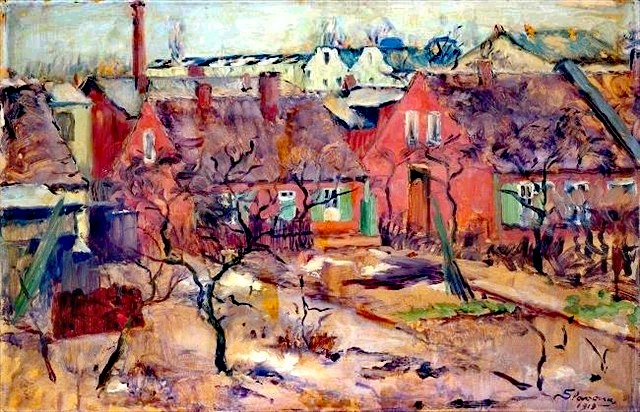
Spring Thaw near Lübeck (1913)

Near the end of the 1920s, her health began to deteriorate and, having failed to find a cure with traditional medicine, turned to anthroposophy and naturopathy. Her health never improved, however, and her last years were spent painting flowers and landscapes in the vicinity of her home near Münsing.

Her work was forgotten for many years, having been branded as "Entartete Kunst" (Degenerate Art) in 1933. During World War II, many of her paintings were destroyed, either intentionally or as a result of the war. It wasn't until 1981 that a significant retrospective was held by the Bröhan Museum in Berlin.
