= Ivana Kobilca =

Slovenian painter (1861–1926)

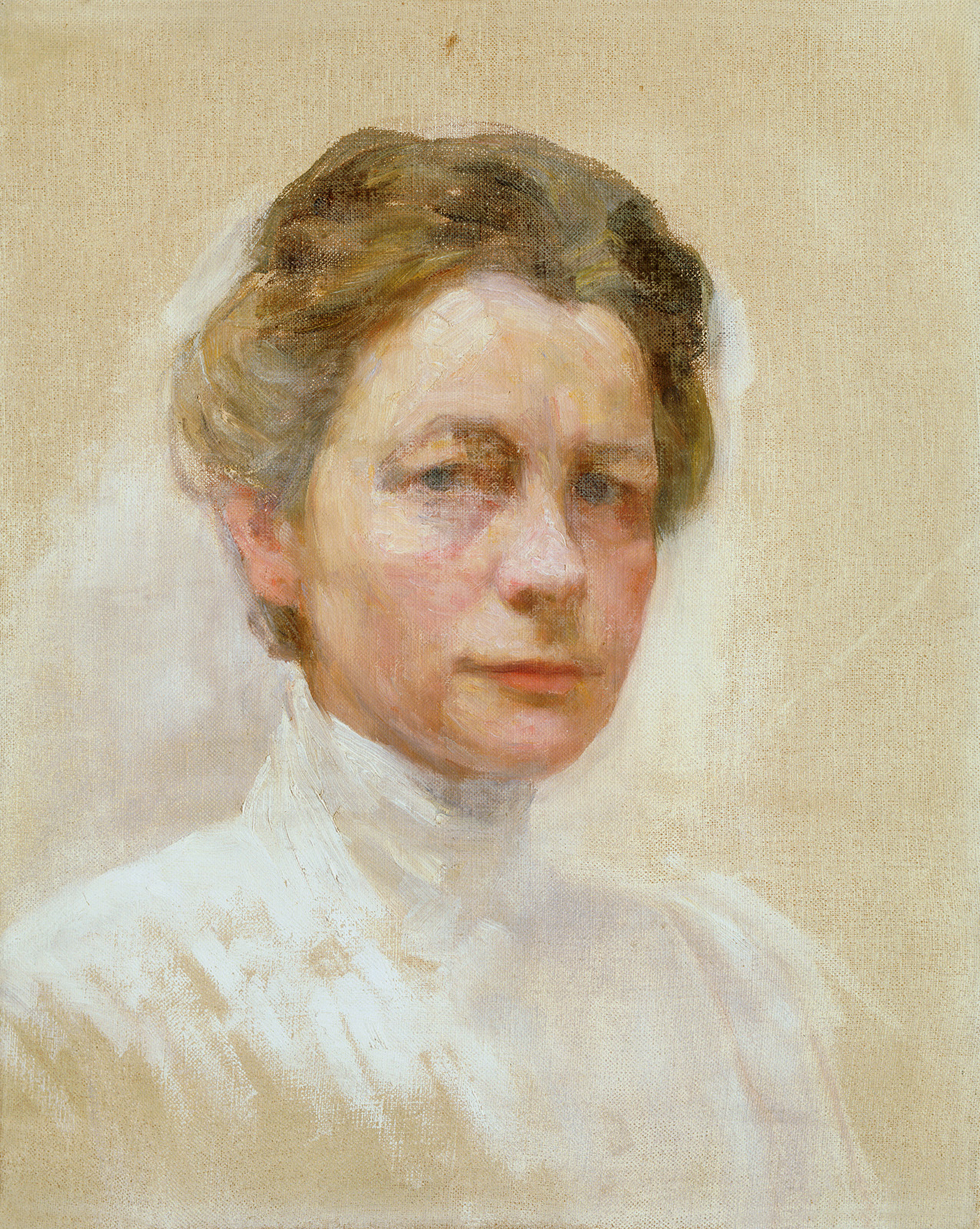
- Self-portrait in White, around 1910
- Born: Ivana Marija Kobilca; December 20, 1861; Ljubljana, Carniola, Austrian Empire
- Died: December 4, 1926 (aged 64); Ljubljana, Kingdom of Serbs, Croats and Slovenes
- Education: School of Arts and Crafts, Munich study with the portrait painter Alois Erdtelt
- Known for: Painting, drawing, photography
- Notable work: Dutch Girl (1886); Zitherist (around 1887); Portrait of Sister Fani (1889); Women Ironers (1891); Self-Portrait with a Palette (1914)
- Movement: Realism
- Elected: Société Nationale des Beaux-Arts

Ivana Kobilca (20 December 1861 – 4 December 1926) was a Slovene painter, and is considered the most prominent painter and a key figure of Slovene cultural identity. She was a realist painter who studied and worked in Vienna, Munich, Paris, Sarajevo, Berlin, and Ljubljana. She mostly painted oil paintings and pastels, whereas her drawings are few. The themes include still life, portraits, genre works, allegories, and religious scenes. She was a controversial person, criticized for following movements that had not developed further in later periods.

== Biography ==
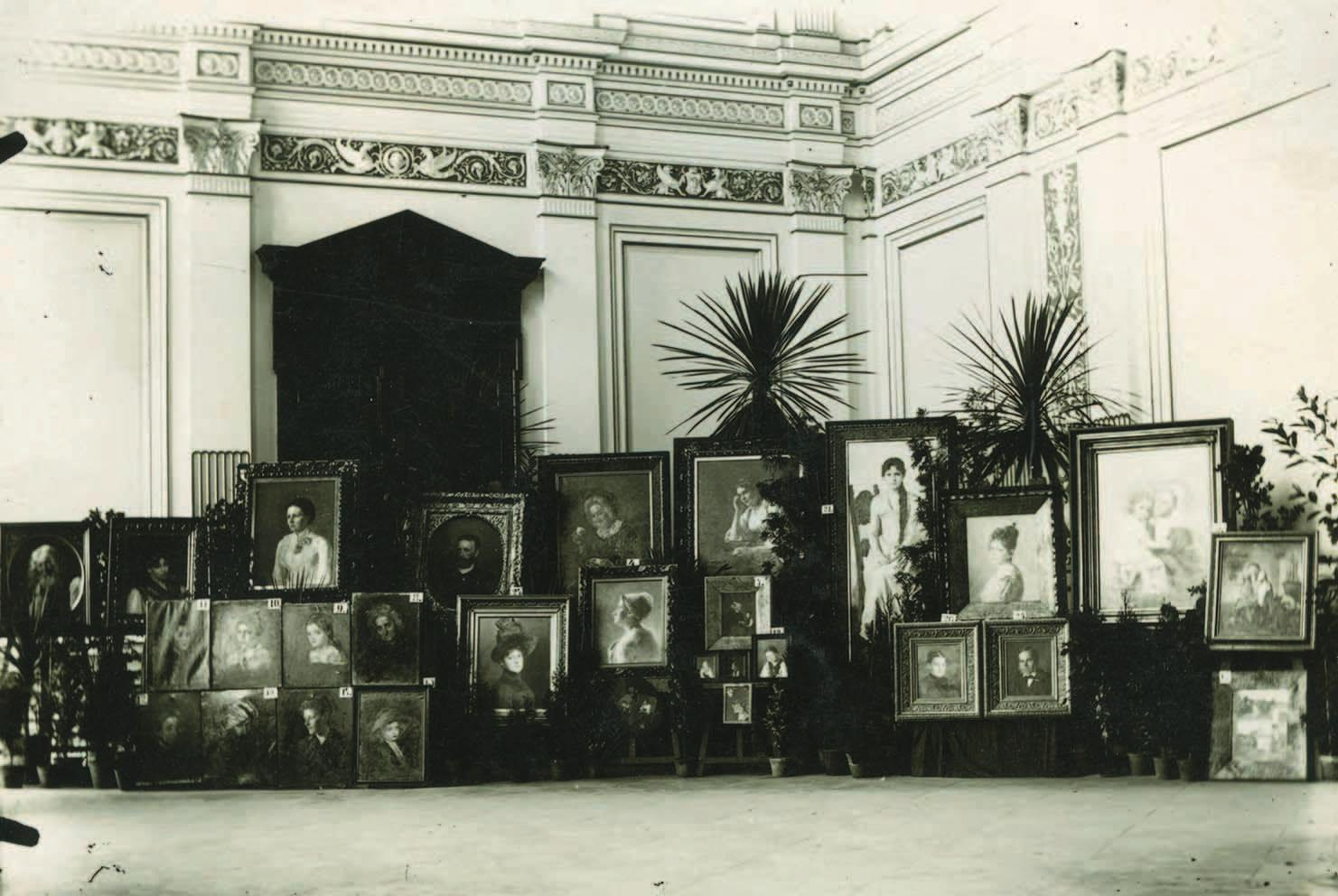
First solo exhibition of Ivana Kobilca in Ljubljana in 1889

Ivana Kobilca was born in Ljubljana as a daughter in a well-off family of umbrella makers Marija Škofič and Jakob Kobilica. Her niece was artist and art collector Mira Pintar. Her parents placed great emphasis on education. At first, she learned how to draw, but also French and Italian, in the Ursuline High School in her home town, where her teacher of drawing was Ida Künl. When she was 16, she went with her father to Vienna, where she saw the paintings of old masters that inspired her. From 1879 to 1880, she studied in Vienna, where she copied the paintings at the gallery of the Academy of Arts, and from 1880 to 1881 in Munich. From 1882 to 1889, she continued her studies under Alois Erdtelt. In 1888, she participated for the first time in a public exhibition. At the following exhibition in Munich, her work was spotted and praised by the prominent German art historian Richard Muther. She then returned to Ljubljana. In 1890, she painted in Zagreb. In 1891 and 1892, she painted in Paris in the private school of Henri Gervex. She became an honorary member (membre associée) of Société Nationale des Beaux Arts. In 1892, she also painted in Barbizon. In 1893, she returned to Ljubljana, visited Florence in 1894, and lived in Sarajevo from 1897 to 1905. From 1906 to 1914, she lived in Berlin, and then returned to Ljubljana. At the time of her death in 1926 in Ljubljana, she was described as the greatest Yugoslav female painter.

== Works and meanings ==
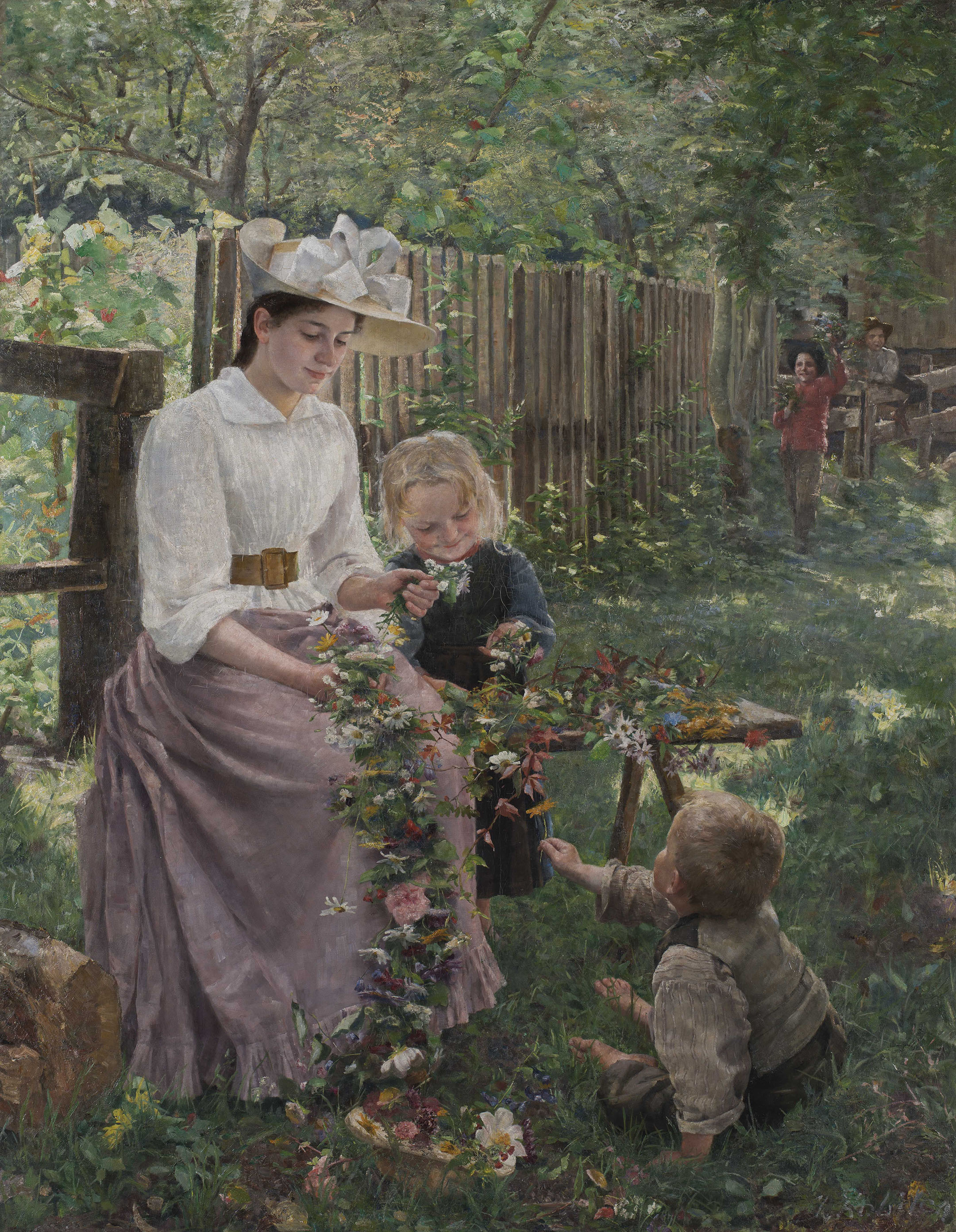
Summer, 1889

Judging by her social origin, way of living, ideals and work, she was an urban artist. She is one of Slovene realists, who created their most important paintings in the 1880s. Kobilca's greatest tribute to Slovenian art was made during the time she lived abroad. Her greatest impact was on figural painting, especially portraits and paintings of typical people's lives in rustic or urban places. Since the time she had spent in Berlin, her most important genre became floral still life. Her early work reflects characteristics of Munich studio-work. Her focus was on value, chiaroscuro and draftsmanship; only her pastels were light and rosy. From 1889 onwards her painting became lighter with blue nuances, typical for Parisian art at the time.

In the late 1880s many artists were influenced by the Impressionist movement that began in France with Monet, Morisot, Renoir and others. Ivana Kobilca, however stayed true to her academic artistic roots; with strong focus on study of value, draftsmanship and realism in oil painting.

Kobilca's best known paintings are Kofetarica (Coffee Drinker), 1888; Citrarica (Zitherist), Likarice (Women Ironers), 1891; Holandsko dekle (Dutch Girl), Portret sestre Fani (Portrait of Sister Fani), 1889; and Poletje (Summer), 1889. Her work is on display at all major European galleries.

== Commemoration ==
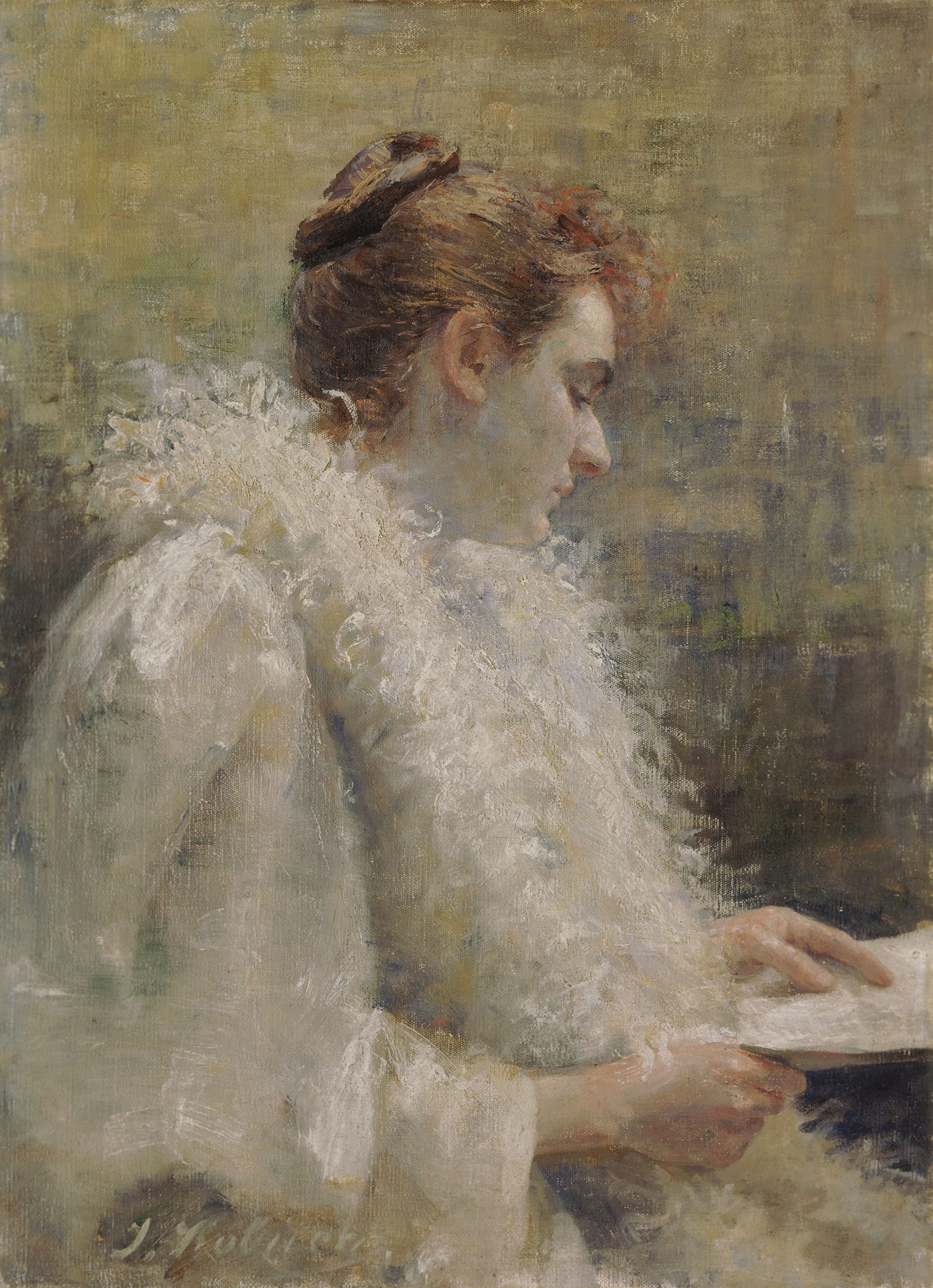
Parisienne With Letter, 1892-3

After Slovenia declared independence from Yugoslavia, Kobilca was portrayed by Rudi Španzel on the 5000 Slovenian tolar banknote. It was in circulation from December 1993 until the introduction of euro in January 2007.
