= Portrait of Vincent van Gogh (1887) =

Painting by Henri de Toulouse-Lautrec

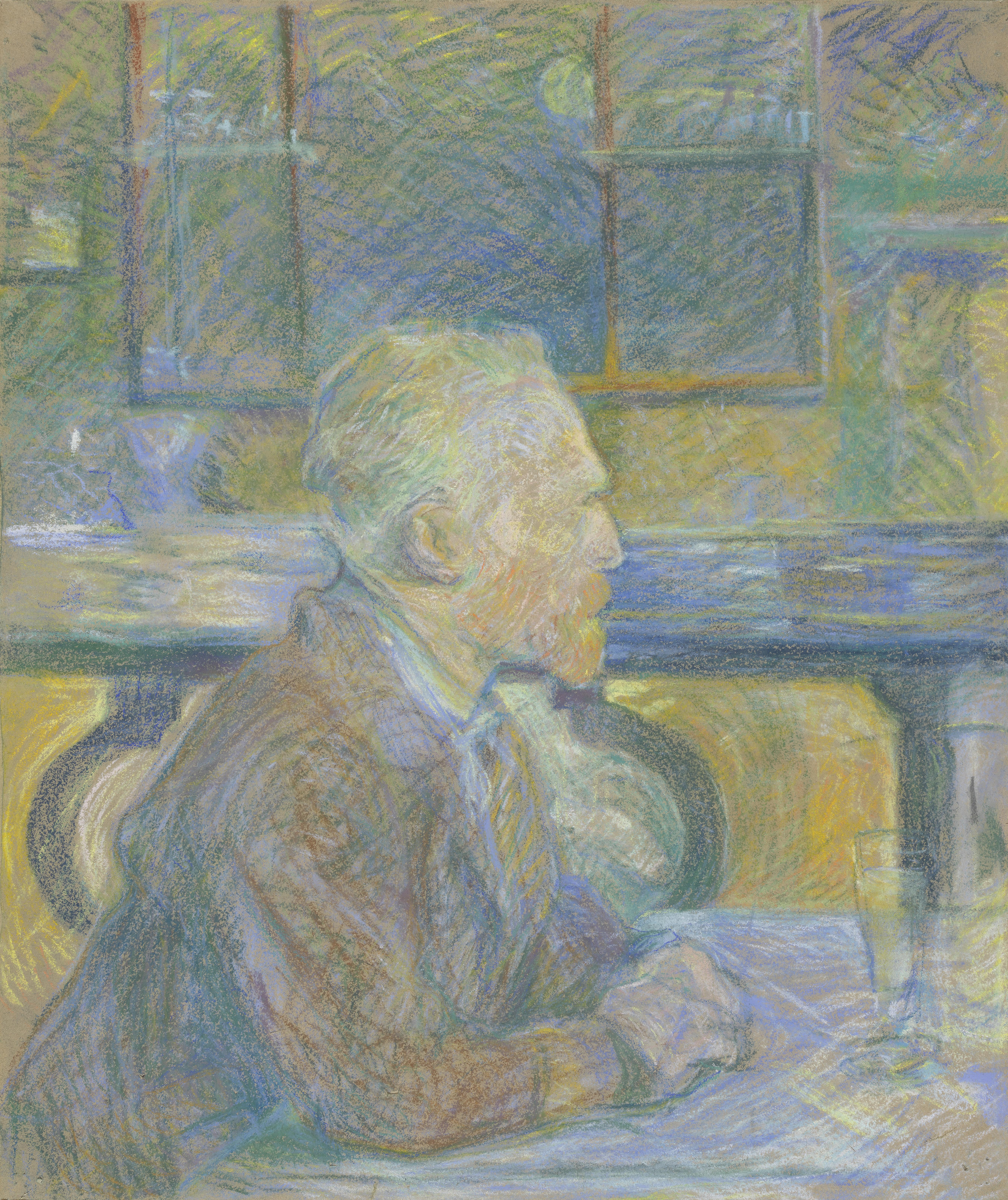
- Artist: Henri de Toulouse-Lautrec
- Year: 1887
- Medium: pastel on cardboard
- Dimensions: 54.2 cm × 46 cm (21.3 in × 18 in)
- Location: Van Gogh Museum, Amsterdam

Portrait of Vincent van Gogh is an 1887 chalk pastel on cardboard by Henri de Toulouse-Lautrec. Toulouse-Lautrec had encountered Vincent van Gogh, eleven years his senior, when they were both taking lessons at the open studio (atelier libre) of Fernand Cormon in Paris from 1886 to 1887. The painting is held by the Van Gogh Museum in Amsterdam, catalogued "d693V/1962".

The brightly coloured Impressionist work, mainly of blues, oranges, and yellows, measures 54.2 cm × 46 cm (21.3 in × 18.1 in). It portrays Van Gogh in early 1887, during the time he was living with his brother, Theo, in the Montmartre district of Paris. He is depicted in profile from the right, leaning forward at a table in a bar, with a glass of absinthe, as if in conversation, at Café du Tambourin on the Boulevard de Clichy. Van Gogh was rumoured to be having a love affair with the café's proprietor, Agostina Segatori. She had worked as an artists' model, and he painted her at least twice, including Agostina Segatori Sitting in the Café du Tambourin. Van Gogh had an arrangement to give artworks to Segatori when he was unable to pay his bills, and he put on an exhibition of his Japanese prints at the café. Their relationship ended acrimoniously when he asked for his early paintings of flowers to be returned.

Other portraits of Van Gogh by his contemporaries include the 1886 portrait by John Russell, a drawing of Vincent with his brother Theo by Lucien Pissarro in 1887, and The Painter of Sunflowers (1888) by Paul Gauguin.

== See also ==
- Portraits of Vincent van Gogh
