= Montmartre (Van Gogh series) =

Painting series by Vincent van Gogh

Street Scene in Montmartre: Le Moulin à Poivre
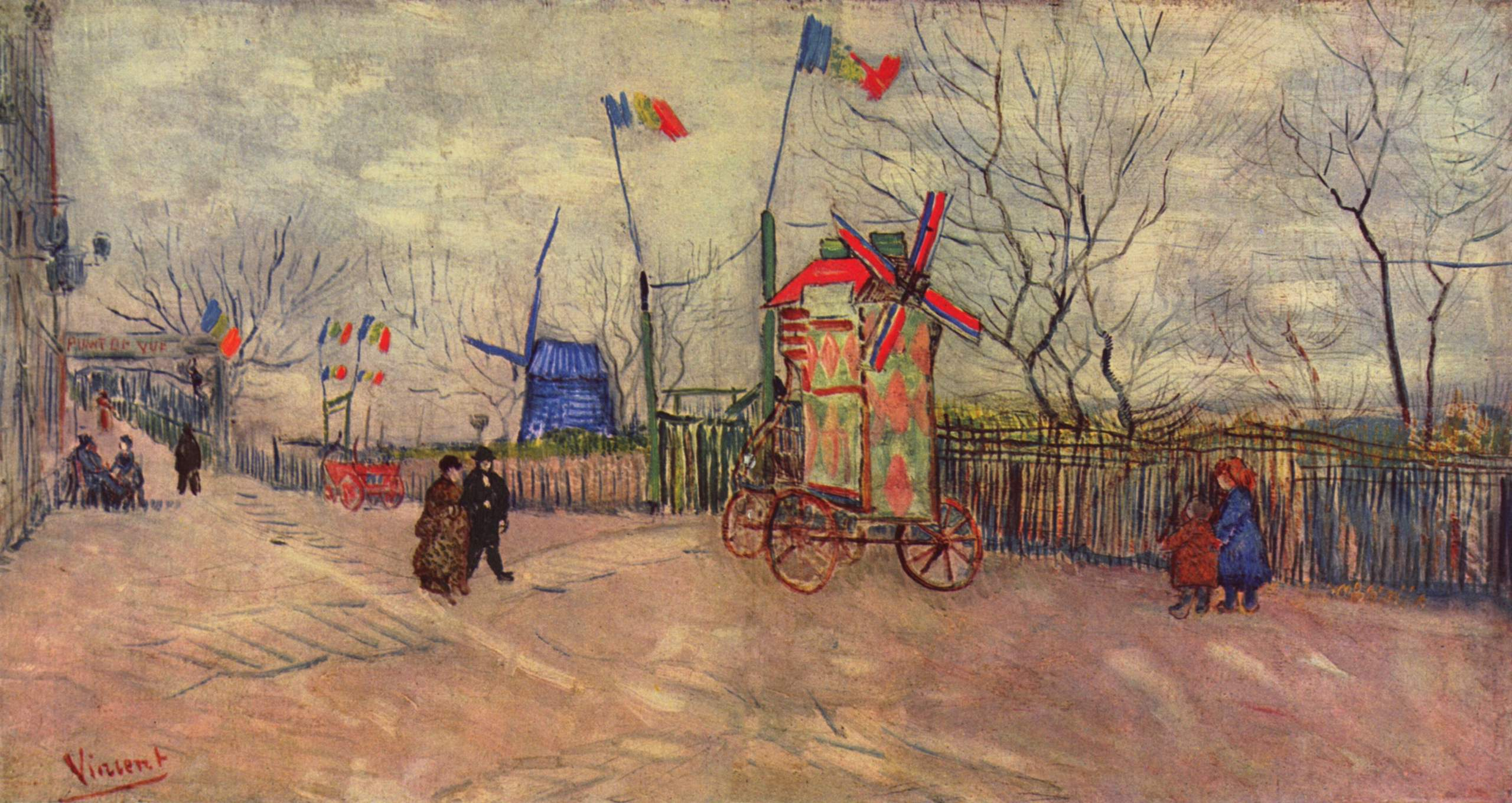
- Artist: Vincent van Gogh
- Year: 1887
- Medium: Oil on canvas
- Location: Van Gogh Museum, Amsterdam (F570)

Researcher Nienke Bakker of the Van Gogh Museum shows how Van Gogh experimented with new painting techniques in Montmartre.

The Montmartre paintings are a group of works that Vincent van Gogh created in 1886 and 1887 of the Paris district of Montmartre while living there, at 54 Rue Lepic, with his brother Theo. Rather than capture urban settings in Paris, Van Gogh preferred pastoral scenes, such as Montmartre and Asnières in the northwest suburbs. Of the two years in Paris, the work from 1886 often has the dark, somber tones of his early works from the Netherlands and Brussels. By the spring of 1887, Van Gogh embraced use of color and light and created his own brushstroke techniques based upon Impressionism and Pointillism. The works in the series provide examples of his work during that period of time and the progression he made as an artist.

== Background ==
=== Paris ===
In 1886, Van Gogh left the Netherlands for Paris and the guidance of his brother Theo van Gogh who was an art dealer. While he had been influenced not only by the great Dutch masters but also to a considerable extent by his cousin-in-law Anton Mauve a Dutch realist painter and a leading member of the Hague School. coming to Paris meant that he would also have the opportunity to be influenced by Impressionists, Symbolists, Pointillists, and Japanese art. His circle of friends included Camille Pissarro, Henri de Toulouse-Lautrec, Paul Gauguin and Émile Bernard.

=== Montmartre ===
Montmartre, sitting on a butte overlooking Paris, was known for its bars, cafes, and dance-hall. It was also located on the edge of countryside that afforded Van Gogh the opportunity to work on paintings of rural settings while living in Paris.

=== Artistic style ===
When Van Gogh painted he intended not just to capture the subject, but to express a message or meaning. It was through his paintings of nature that he was most successful at accomplishing his goal. It also created a great challenge: how to portray the subject and create a work that would resonate with the audience.

== Works ==
=== Montmartre scenes ===
The Boulevard de Clichy (F292), a street in Montmartre, played an important role in Van Gogh's life in Paris. The Café du Tambourin was located there, a restaurant just around the corner from the apartment where he lived with his brother Theo. There Van Gogh met with other artists and displayed some of his works. He had a relationship with the owner of the establishment, Agostina Segatori, who was also the subject in his painting Agostina Segatori Sitting in the Café du Tambourin. Located on the boulevard was the studio of Fernand Cormon, where Van Gogh received training, as well as the Moulin Rouge and the homes of several of his friends, whom he referred to as "Impressionistes du Petit Boulevard": John Russell, Georges-Pierre Seurat and Paul Signac. The painting of the Boulevard is Impressionistic in terms of subject and technique. Van Gogh used short brush strokes to depict the figures of the people and the buildings. Light is reflected off the road. Capturing a moment in a street scene was a common theme for Impressionists. The vantage point for the painting was looking northwest from Place Blanche. Rue Lepic's entrance is on the right side of the painting. Van Gogh also made a drawing of this site from a greater distance.

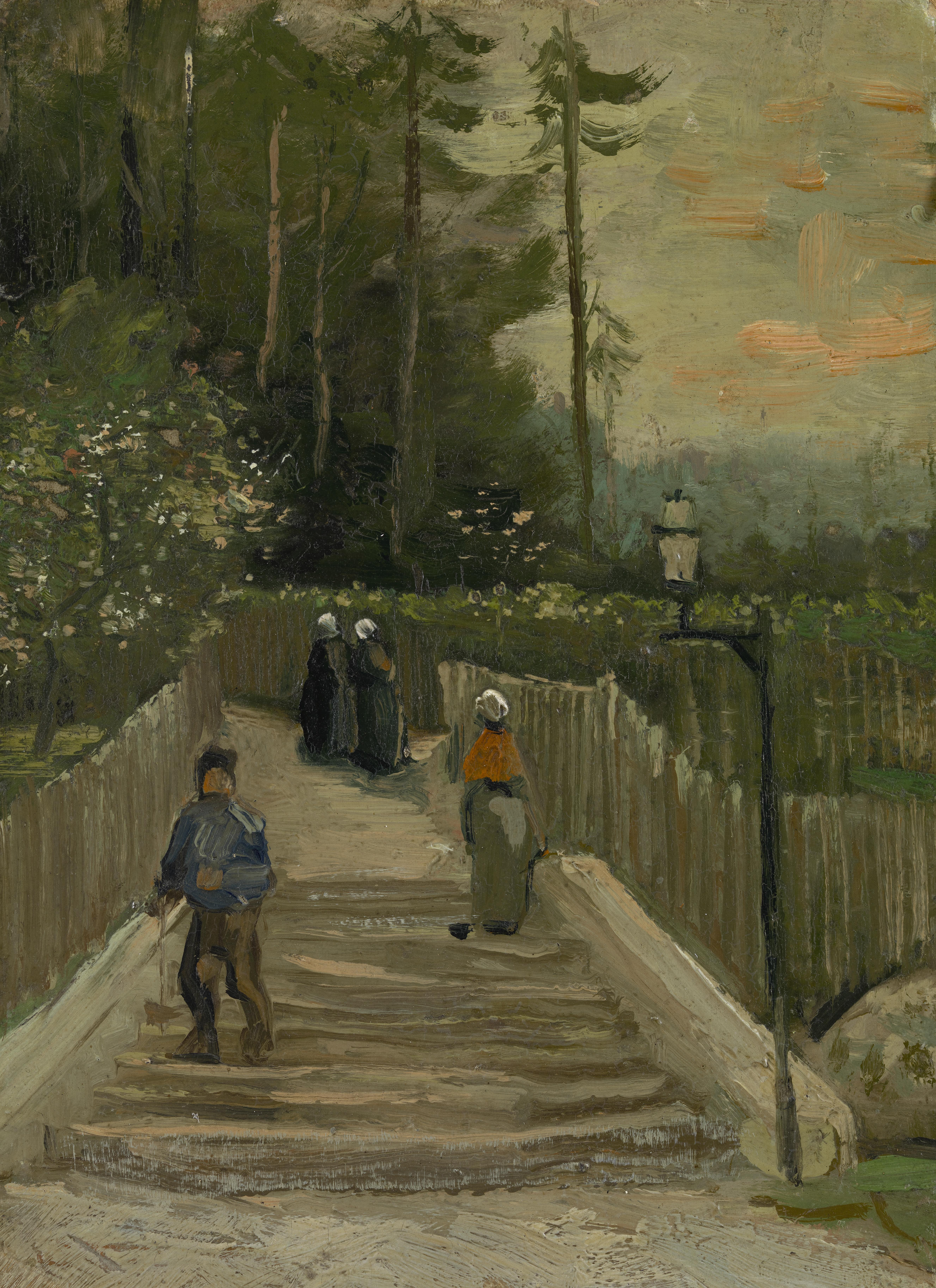
Sloping Path in Montmartre
1886
Van Gogh Museum, Amsterdam (F232)

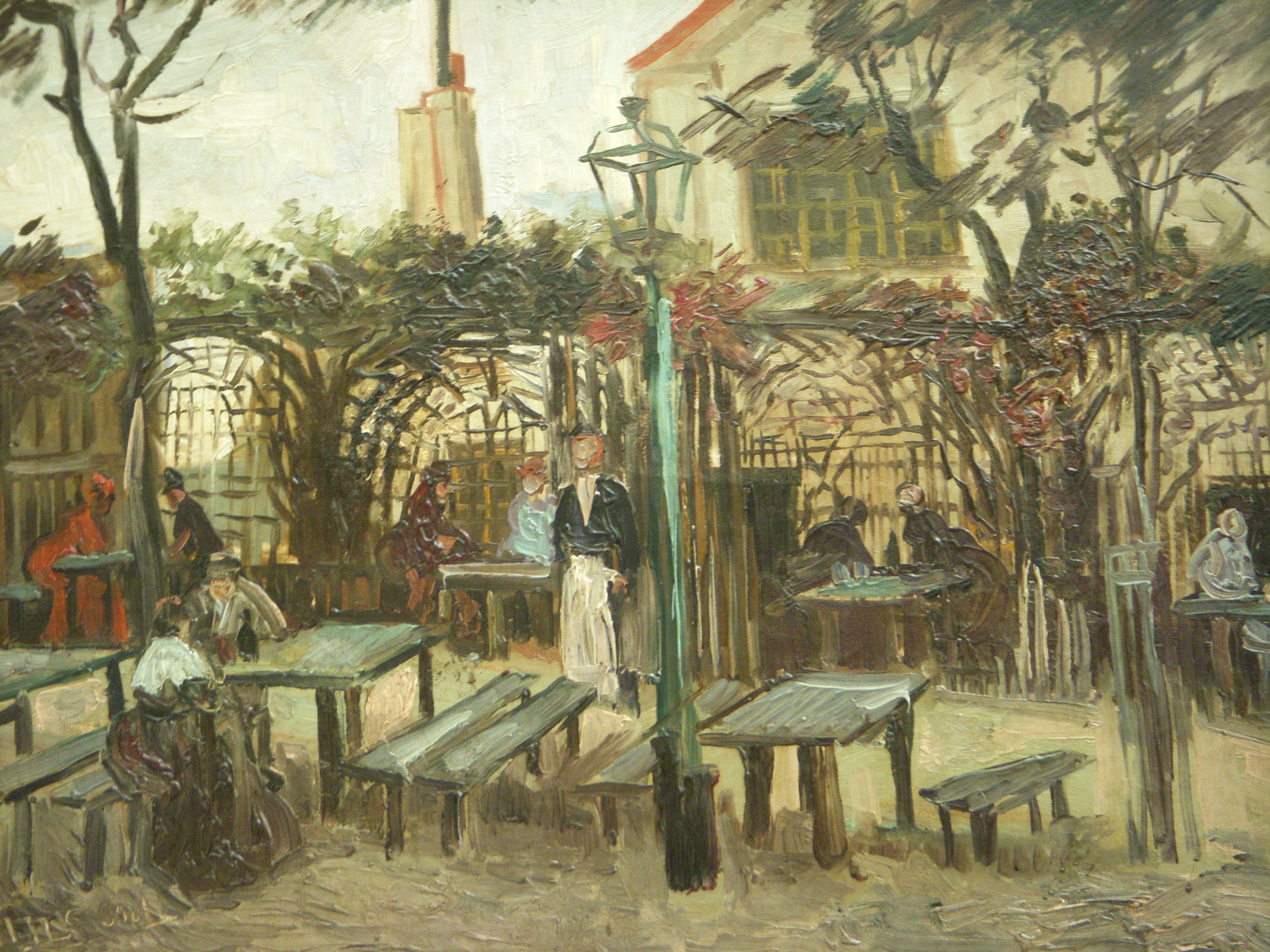
Terrace of a Cafe on Montmartre (La Guinguette)
1886
Musée d'Orsay, Paris (F238)

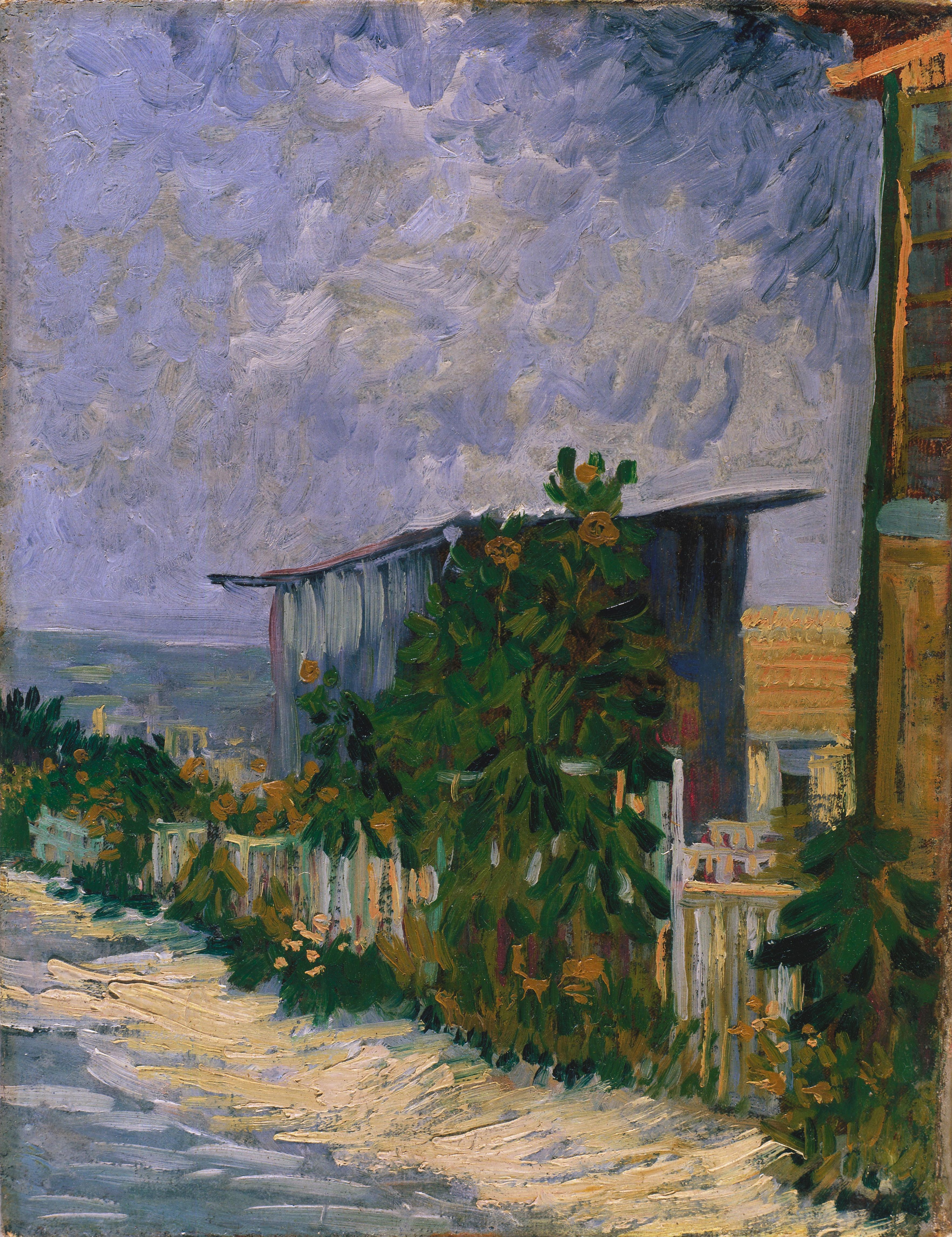
Shelter on Montmartre
1886
Fine Arts Museums of San Francisco, San Francisco (F264a)

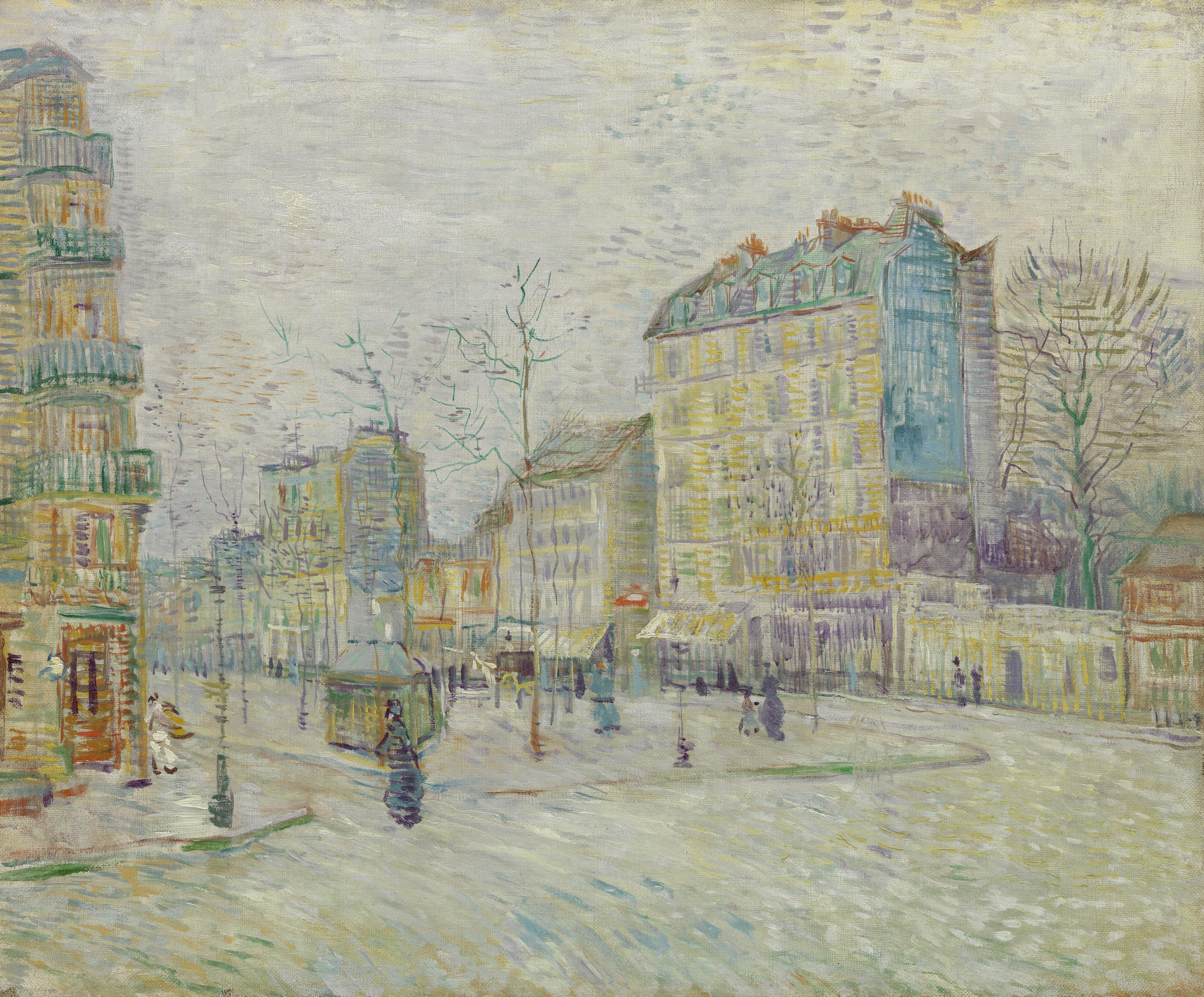
Boulevard de Clichy
1887
Van Gogh Museum, Amsterdam (F292)

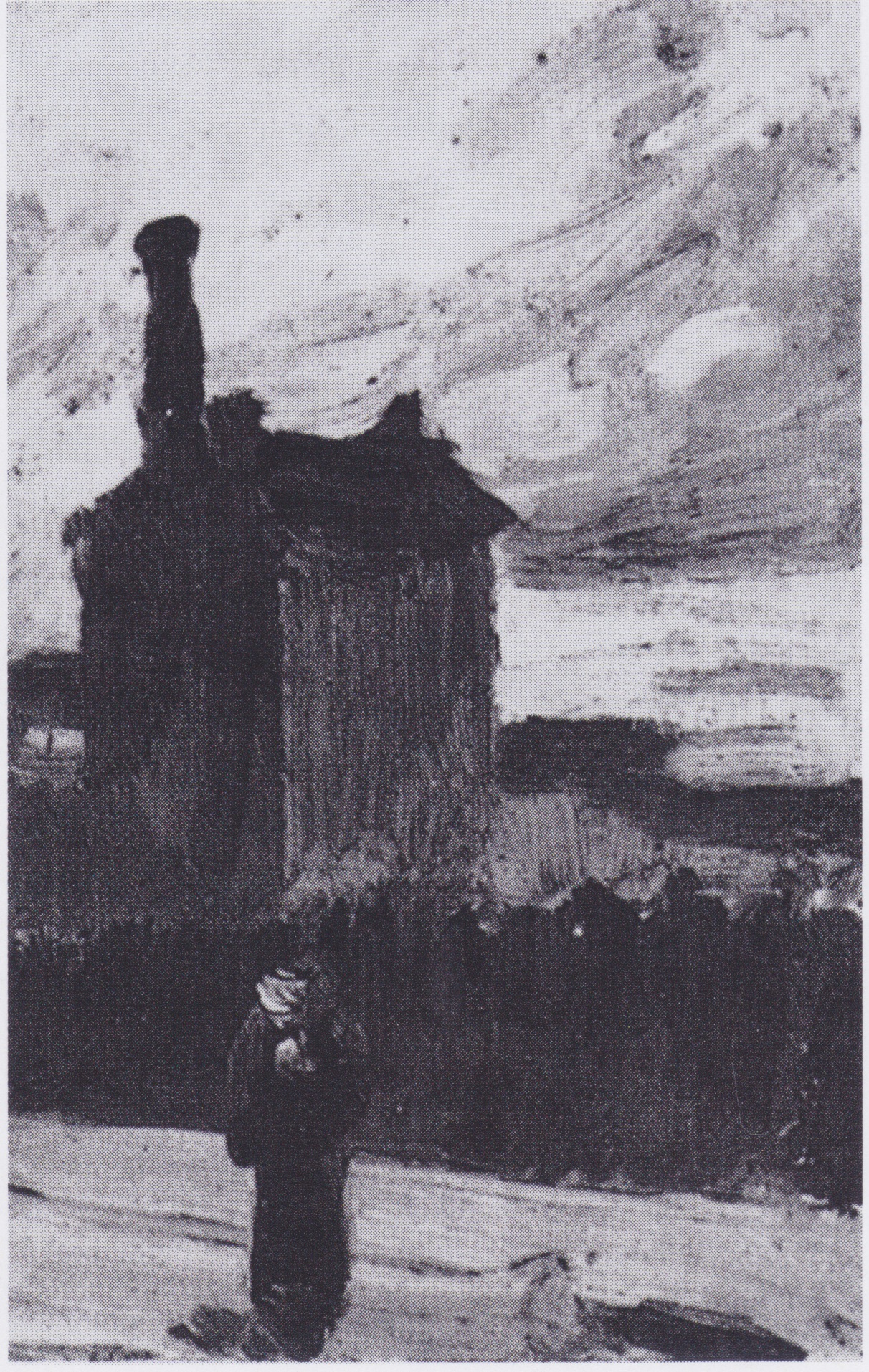
Twilight, before the Storm: Montmartre
1886
Private collection (F1672)

=== Le Moulin de la Galette ===
Van Gogh created a number of paintings titled Le Moulin de la Galette, which was also called Moulin Bloute-Fin. In Van Gogh's first year in Paris he painted rural areas around Montmartre, such as the butte and its windmills. The colors are somber and evoke a sense of his anxiety and loneliness.

The landscape and windmills around Montmartre were the source of inspiration for a number of Van Gogh's paintings. The Moulin de la Galette, still standing, is located near the apartment he shared with his brother. Built in 1622, it was originally called Blute-Fin and belonged to the Debray family in the 19th century. Van Gogh met artists such as Toulouse-Lautrec, Paul Signac and Paul Gauguin who inspired him to incorporate Impressionism into his artwork resulting in lighter, more colorful paintings.

Windmills also featured in some of Van Gogh's landscape paintings of Montmartre.

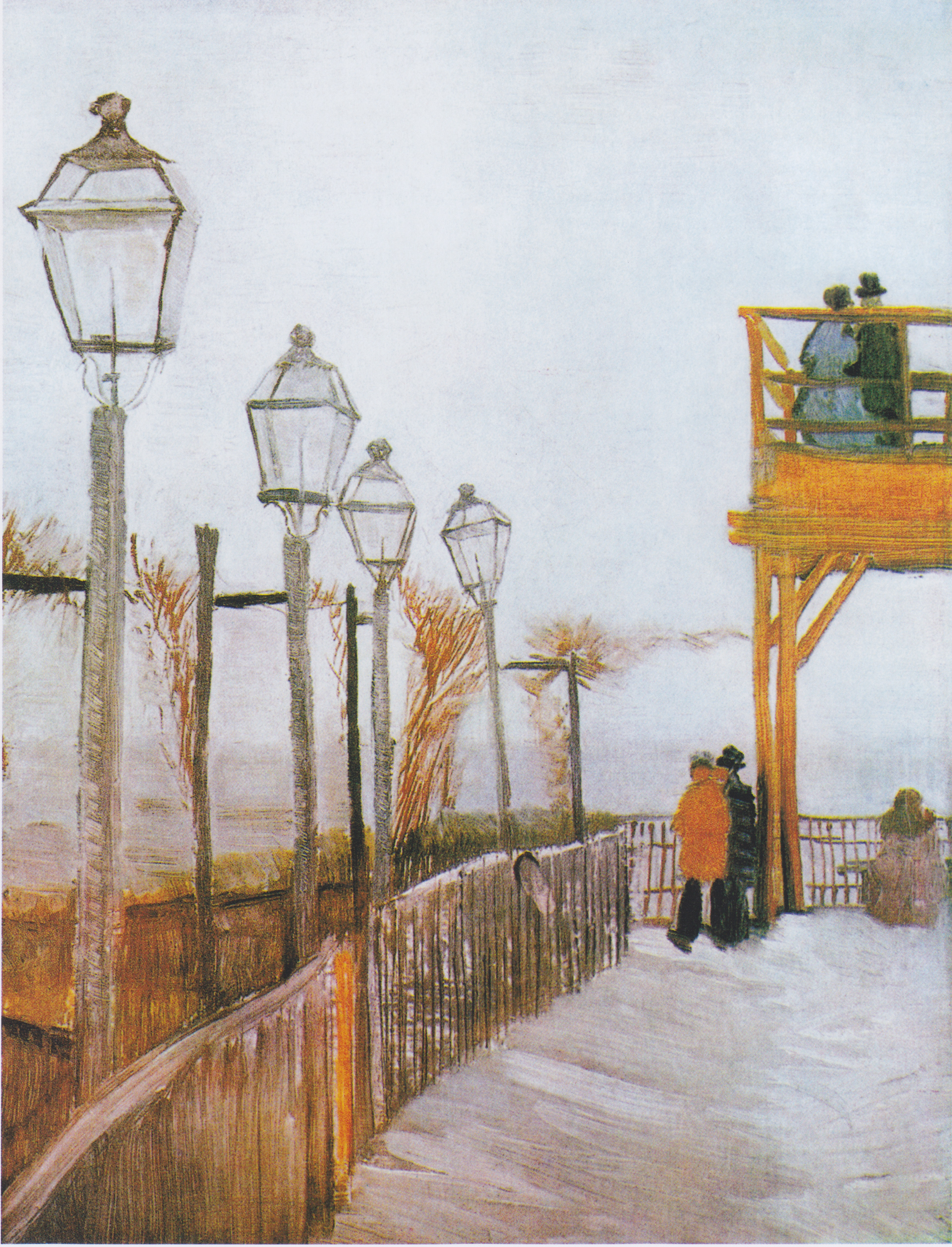
Le Moulin de la Galette Terrace and Observation Deck at the Moulin de Blute-Fin, Montmartre
1886
Art Institute of Chicago (F272)

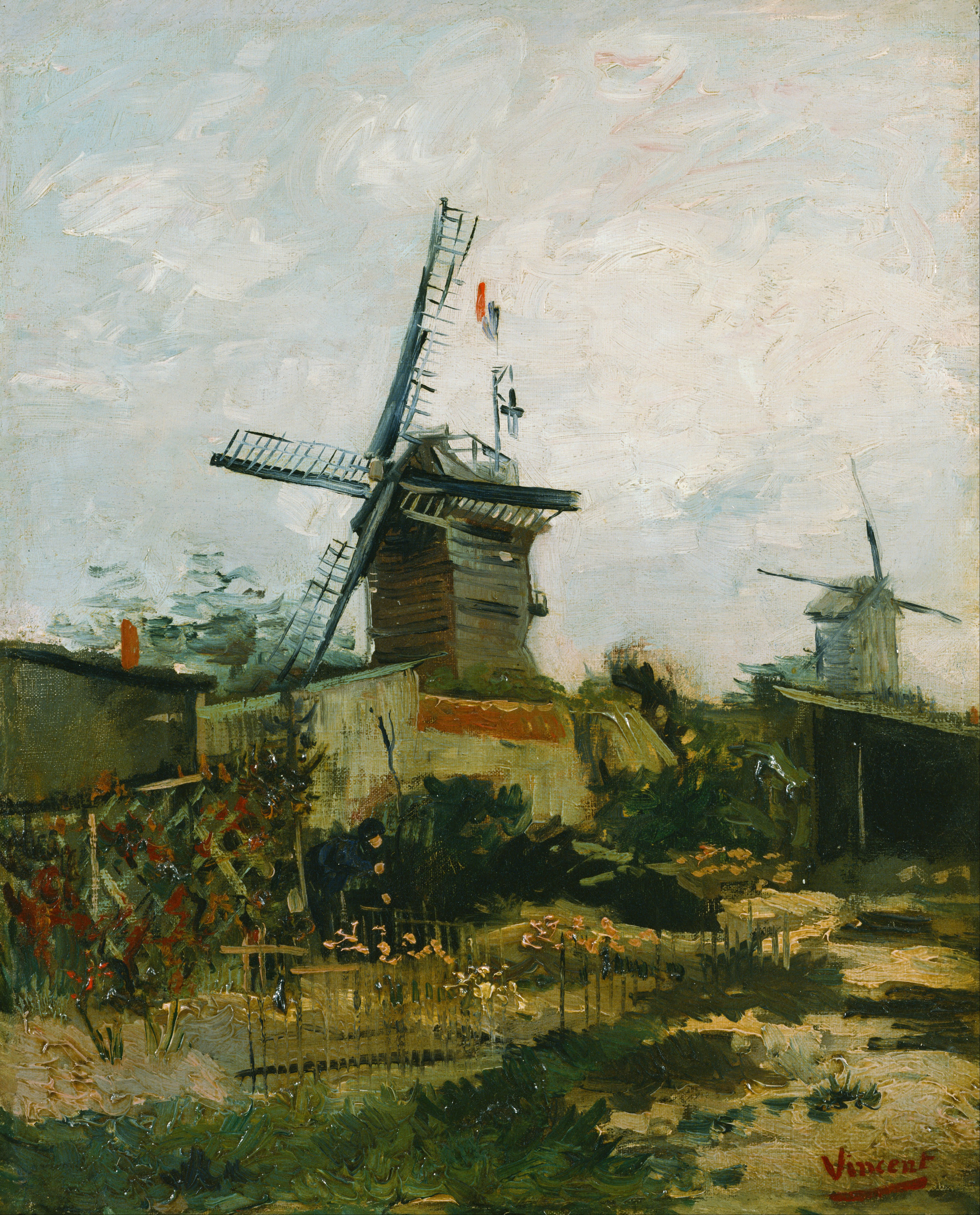
Le Moulin de Blute-Fin
1886
Bridgestone Museum of Art, Tokyo (F273)

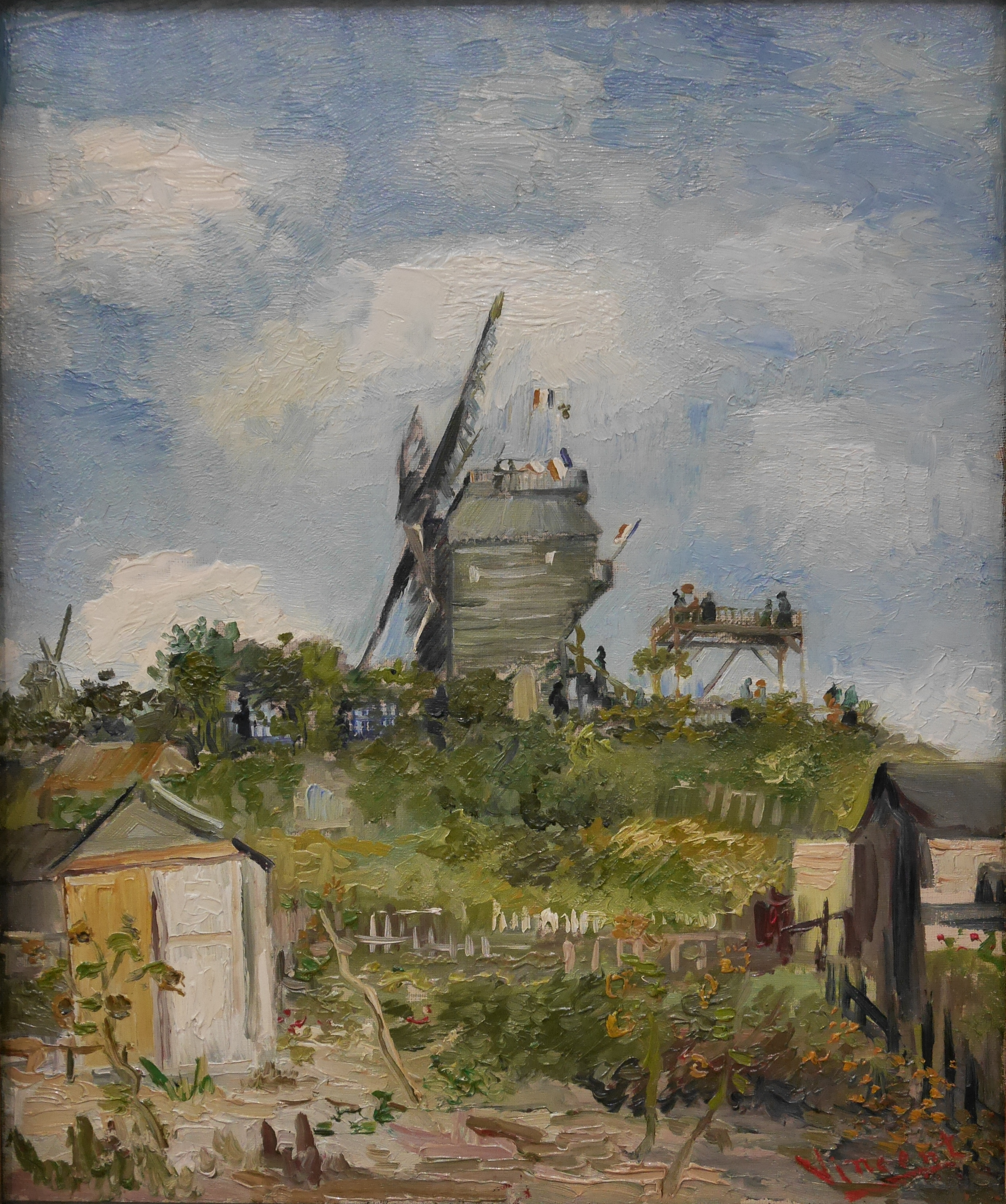
Le Moulin de la Galette, also The Blute-Fin Windmill, Montmartre
1886
Kelvingrove Art Gallery and Museum, Glasgow (F274)

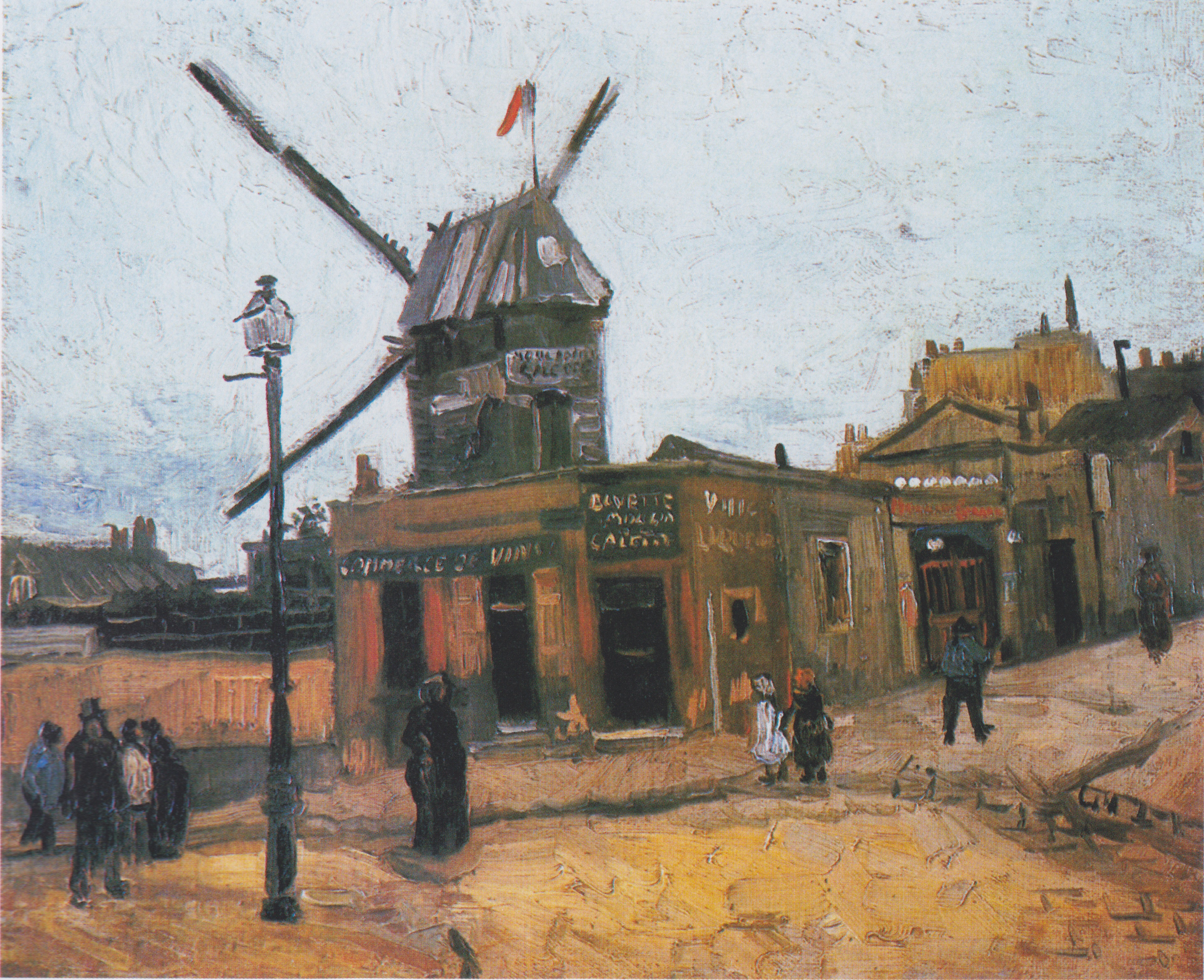
Le Moulin de la Galette
1886
Kröller-Müller Museum, Otterlo, Netherlands (F227)

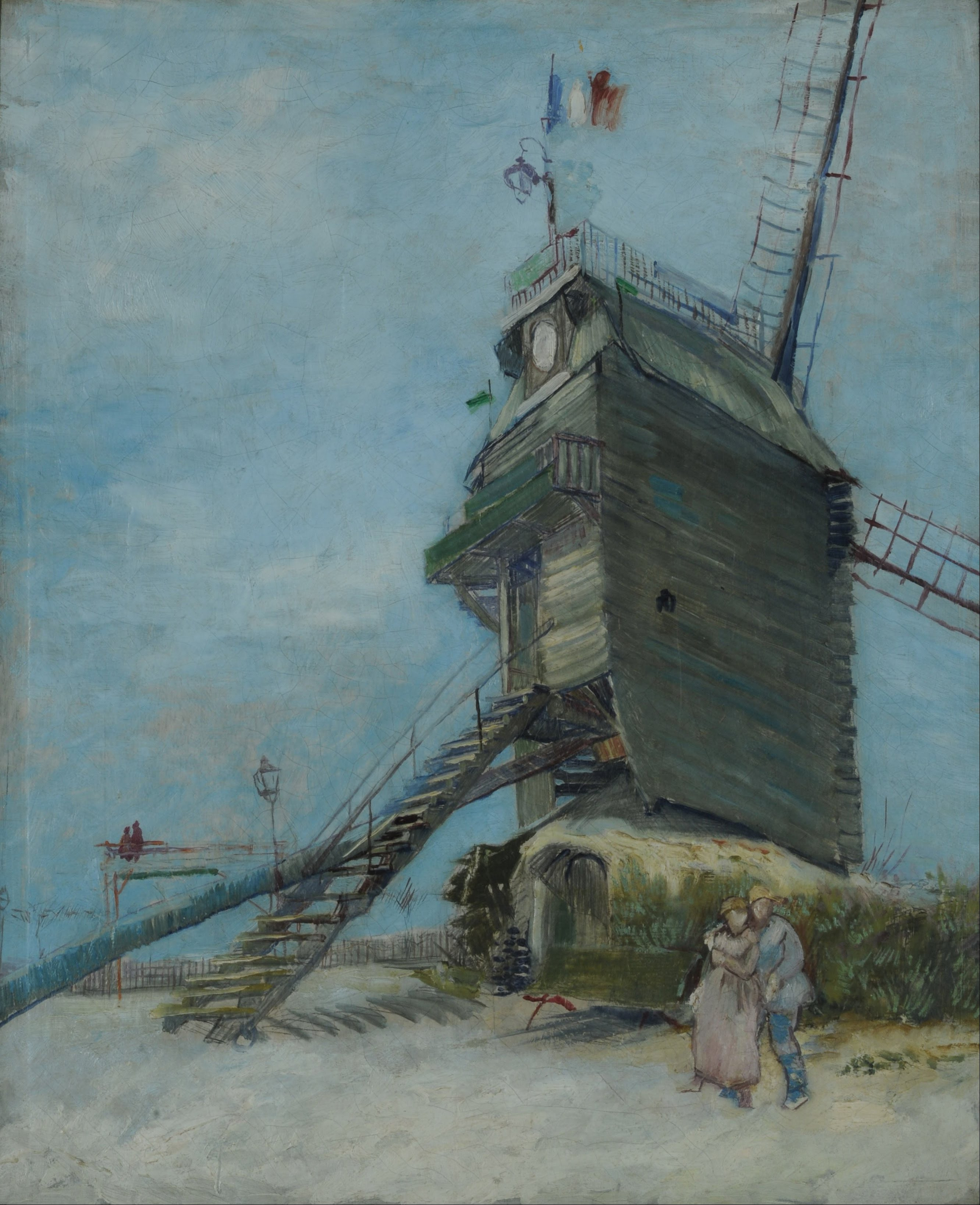
Le Moulin de la Galette
1886
Museo Nacional de Bellas Artes (Buenos Aires), Argentina (F348)

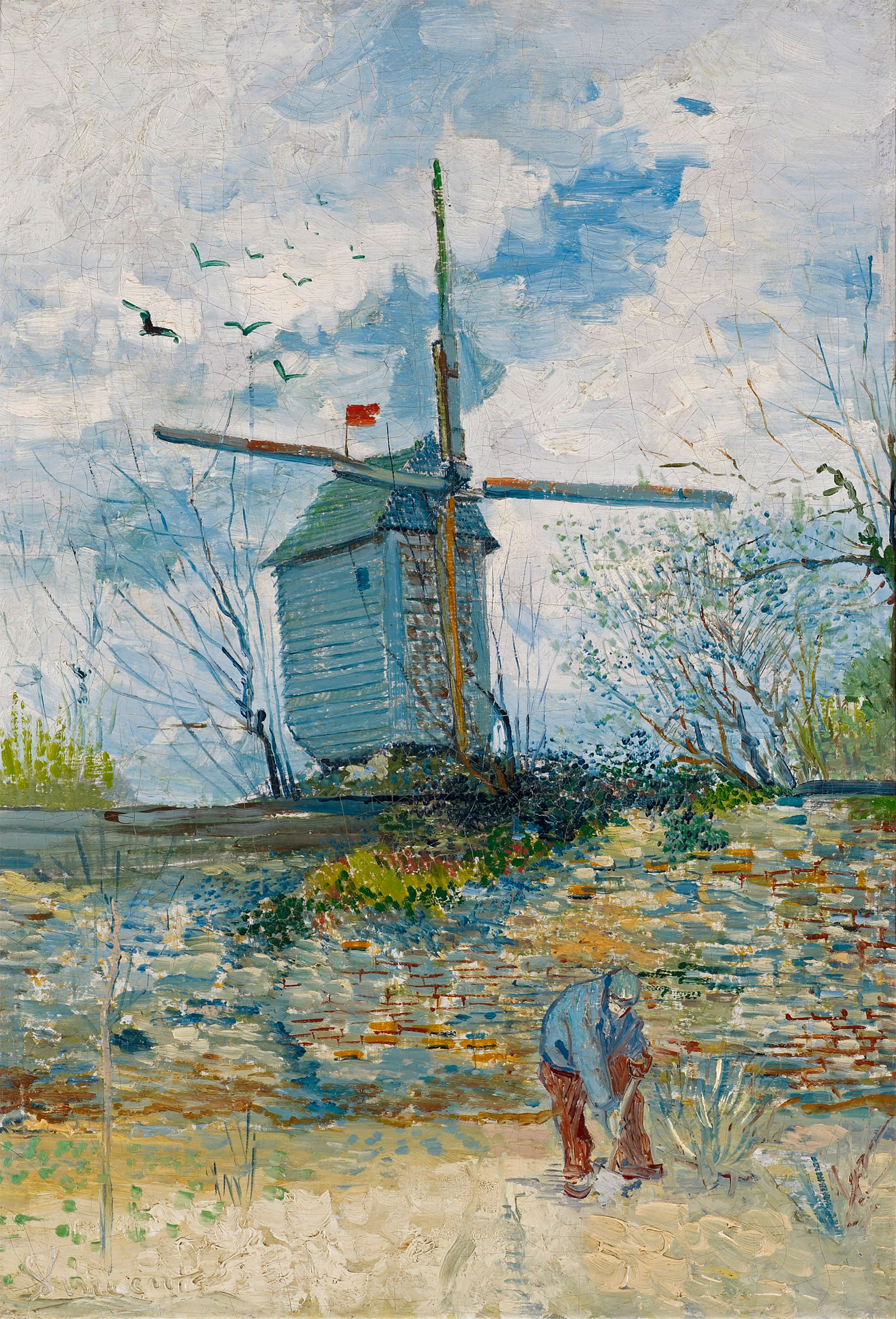
Le Moulin de la Galette
1886
Private collection (F349)

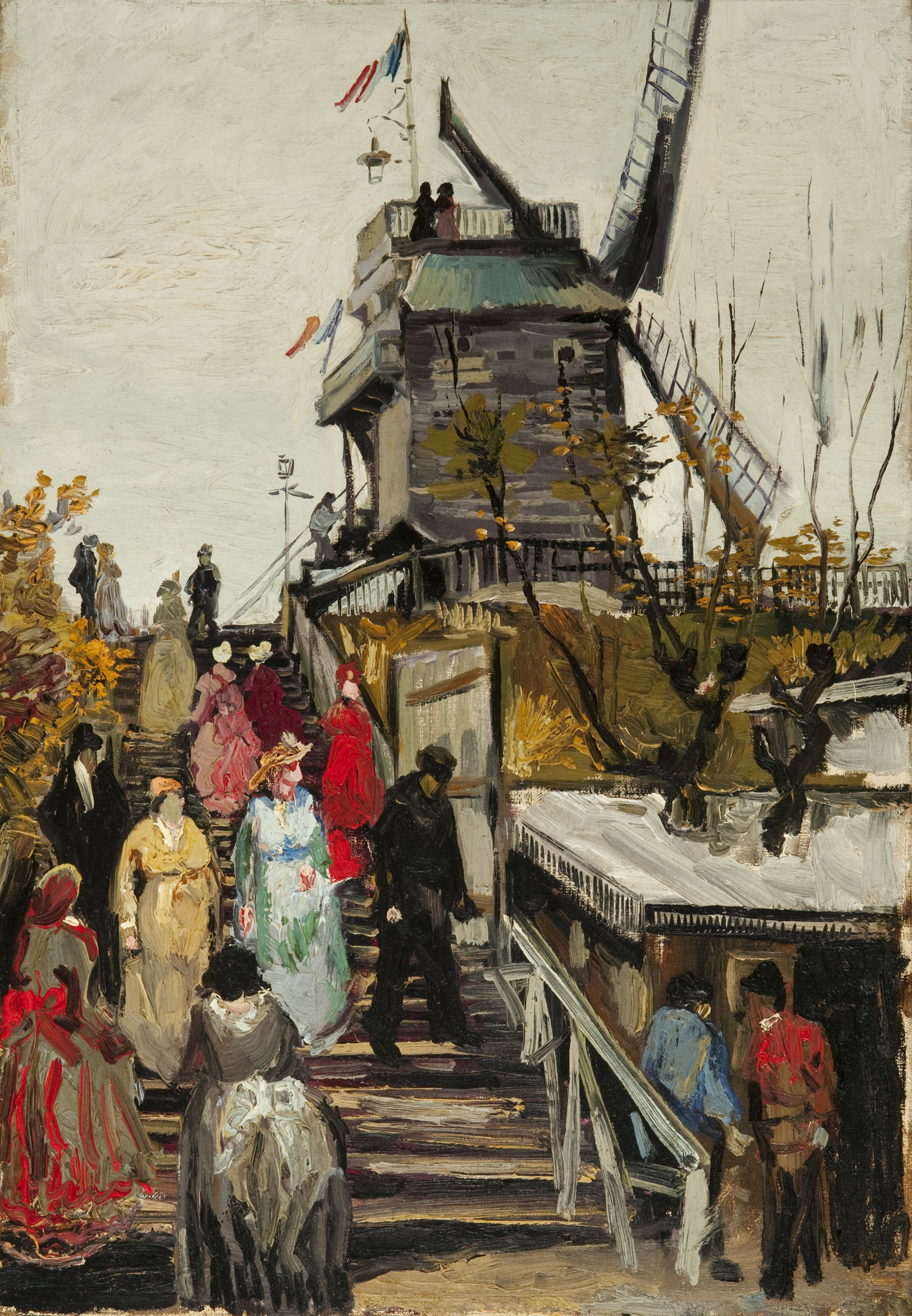
Le Moulin de blute-fin,
1886
Zwolle, Museum De Fundatie

=== Other windmill paintings ===
The Hill of Montmartre with Stone Quarry (F229) was but one of Van Gogh's paintings of the Montmartre countryside. The apartment where he lived with his brother bordered the countryside and overlooked the city of Paris. At the time the work was painted, the country landscape was beginning to disappear as a result of the city's expansion. Soon the fields, pastures and windmills would largely disappear from the Montmartre area. Van Gogh draws the audience in by use of the diagonal line of fences to the windmill just right of the center of the picture. This technique also established depth in the work.

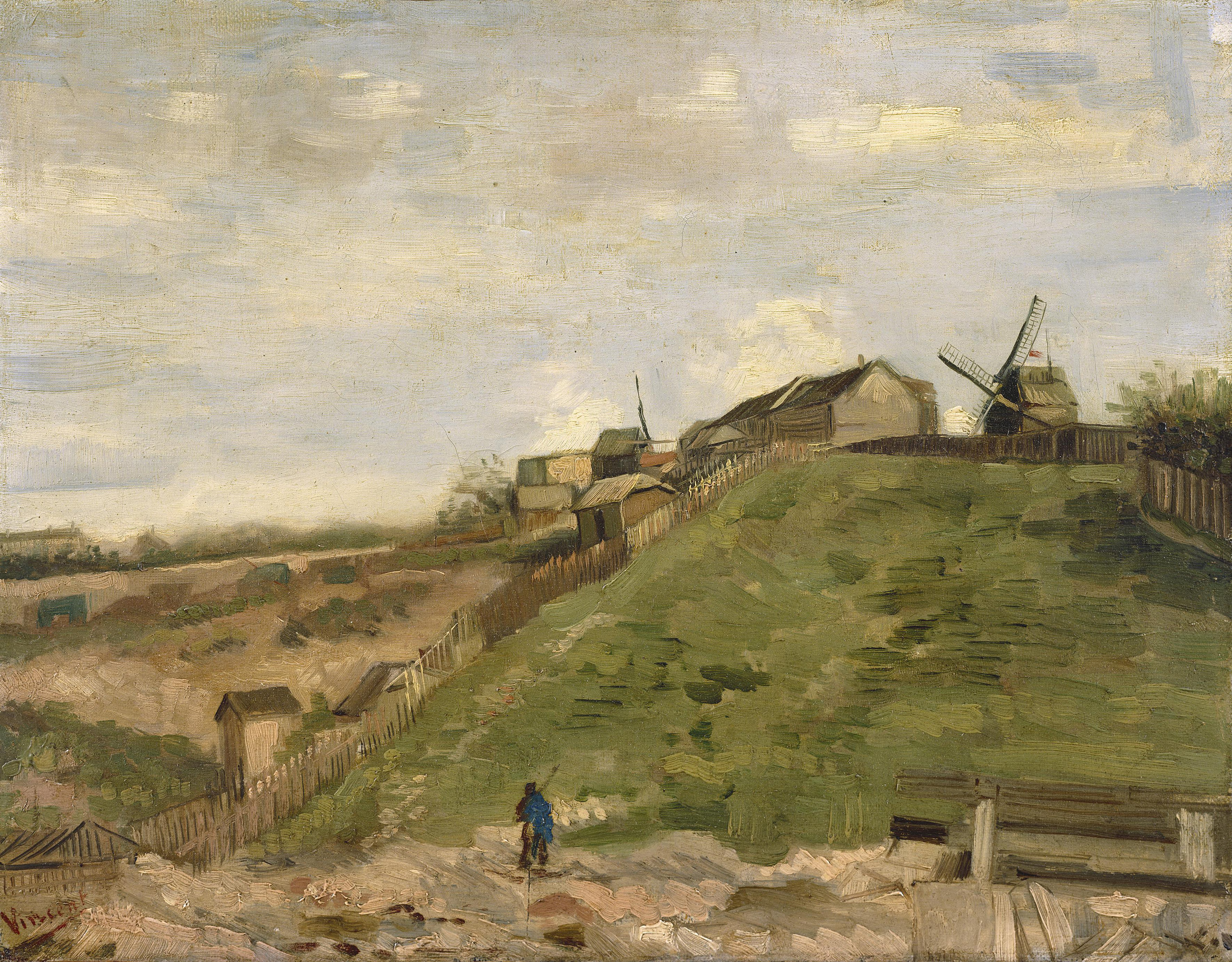
The Hill of Montmartre with Stone Quarry
1886
Van Gogh Museum, Amsterdam (F229)

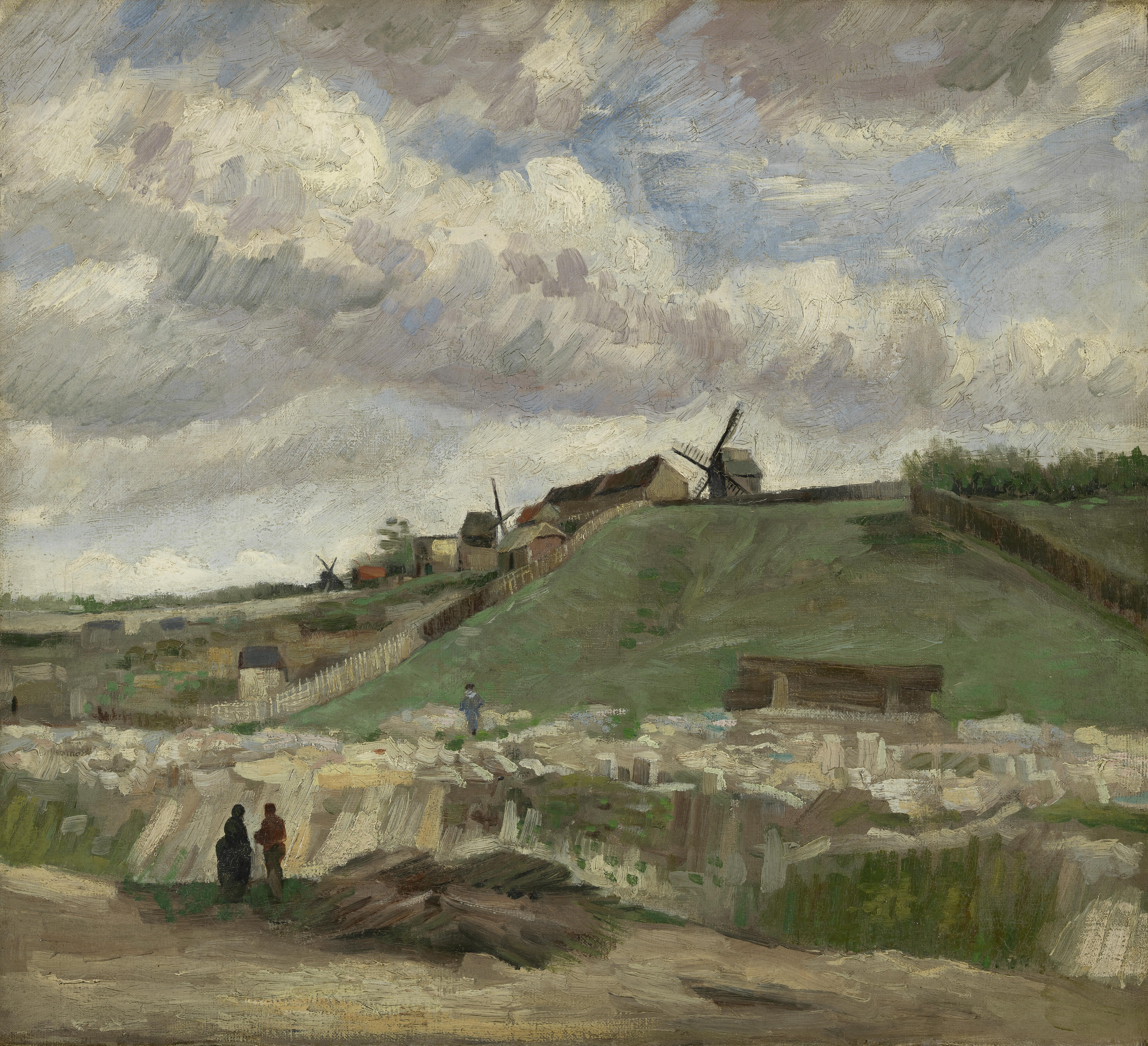
The Hill of Montmartre with Quarry
1886
Van Gogh Museum, Amsterdam (F230)

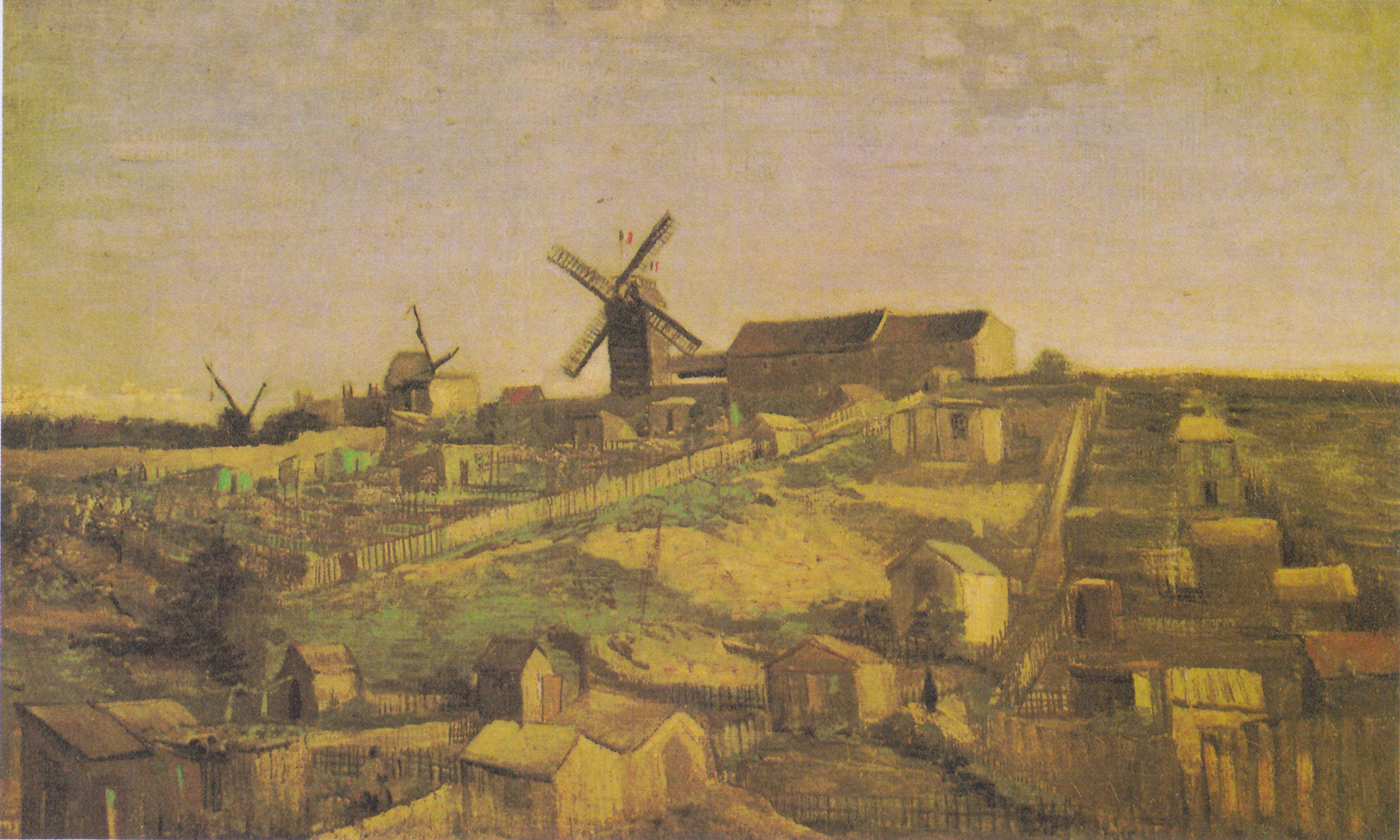
The Hill of Montmartre also View of Montmartre with Windmills
1886
Kröller-Müller Museum, Otterlo, Netherlands (F266)

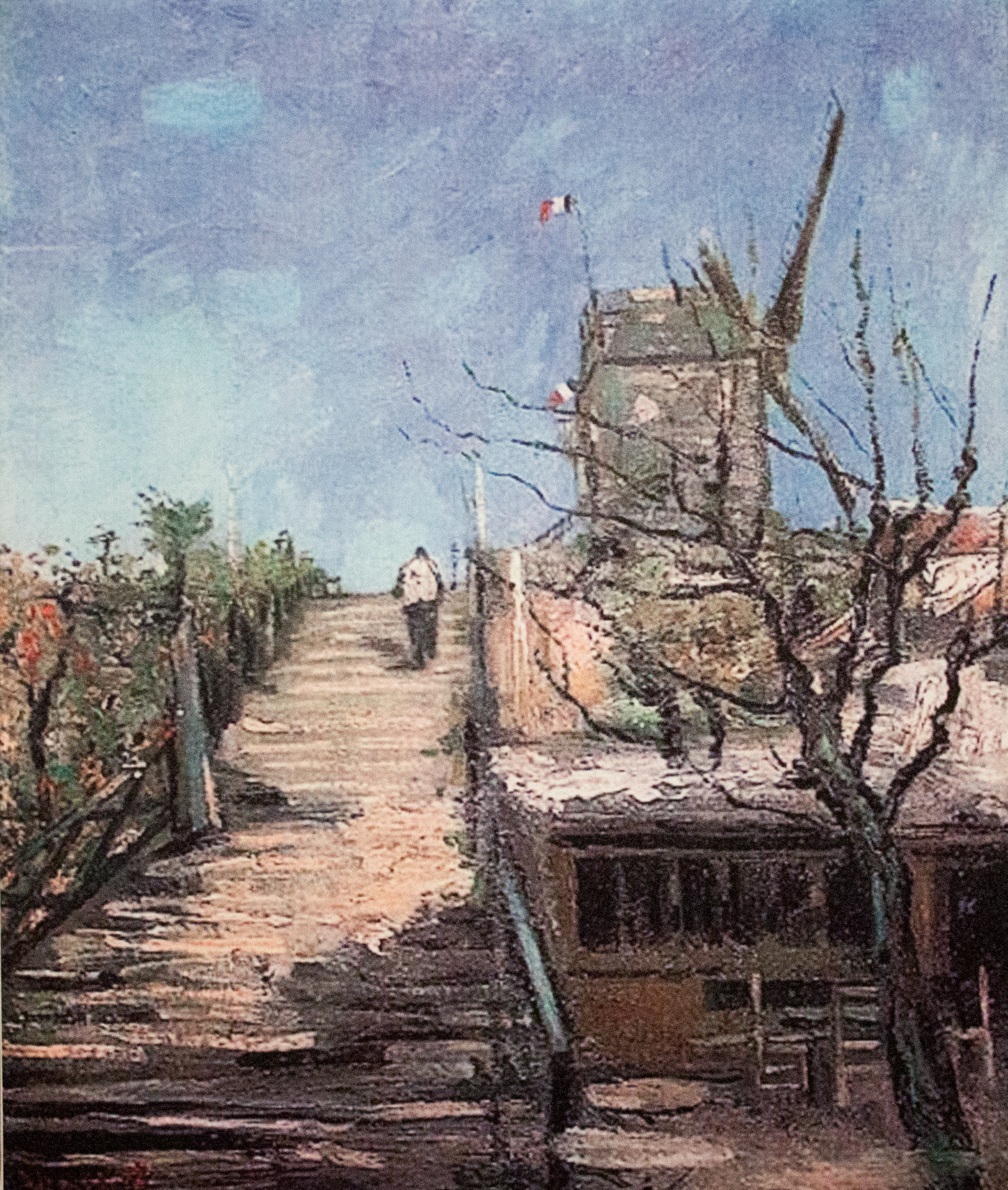
Windmill on Montmartre (b/w copy)
1886
Destroyed by fire in 1967 (F271)

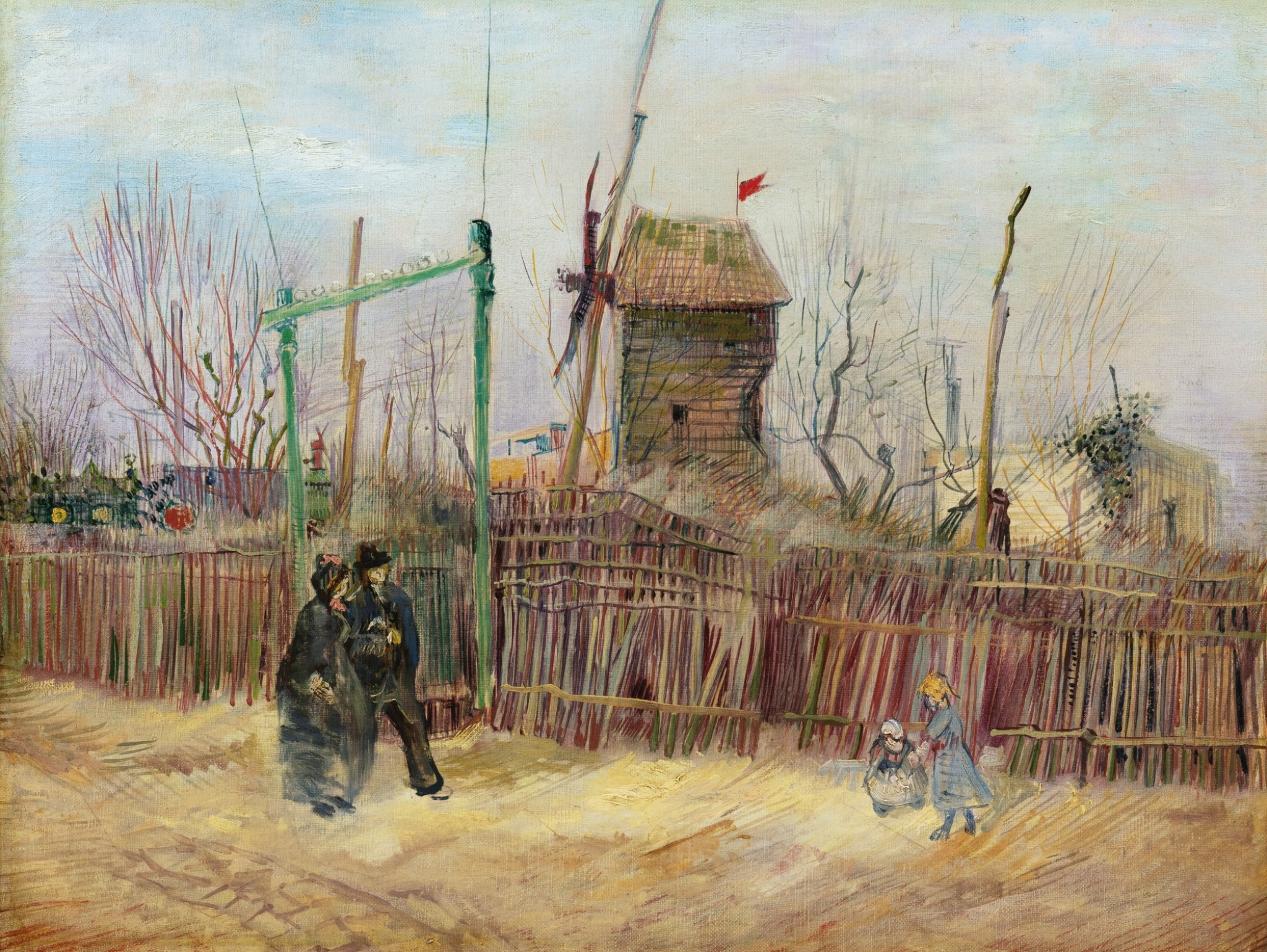
Street Scene in Montmartre
1887
Private collection (No F number, JH1240)

=== Vegetable gardens in Montmartre ===
Montmartre's vegetable gardens, fenced in blocks for security and to clearly separate the allotted spaces, supplied the Paris markets with spinach, lettuce, cabbage and other vegetables.

Vegetable Gardens in Montmartre: La Butte Montmartre (F346) depicts the changing landscape of the Montmartre landscape. In the foreground are allotted vegetable gardens with people working in their allotments. Although still somewhat rural, a large apartment building is constructed in the fields. The three remaining windmills in the area had now become a source of entertainment and respite from working in the city. Le Blute-Fin, also called Le Moulin de la Galette was the largest standing mill offering a café and a terraced viewing platform for looking over Paris from behind the mill. Between the mills are dining establishments and dance halls. He used techniques he picked up from the Impressionists and Pointillists, such as use of short brush strokes or dots of color. The colors are much brighter than the somber colors he used in the Netherlands.

Vegetable Gardens in Montmartre: La Butte Montmartre (F316), the same name as painting F346, was selected by Van Gogh for his first exhibition in 1888 in Paris. Both paintings reflect how much he had learned since he came to Paris and were made on the same hill. The summery landscape depicts the vegetable gardens with the city skyline in the distance. Van Gogh was pleased with his work on this painting, commenting that it "breathed fresh air and joy".

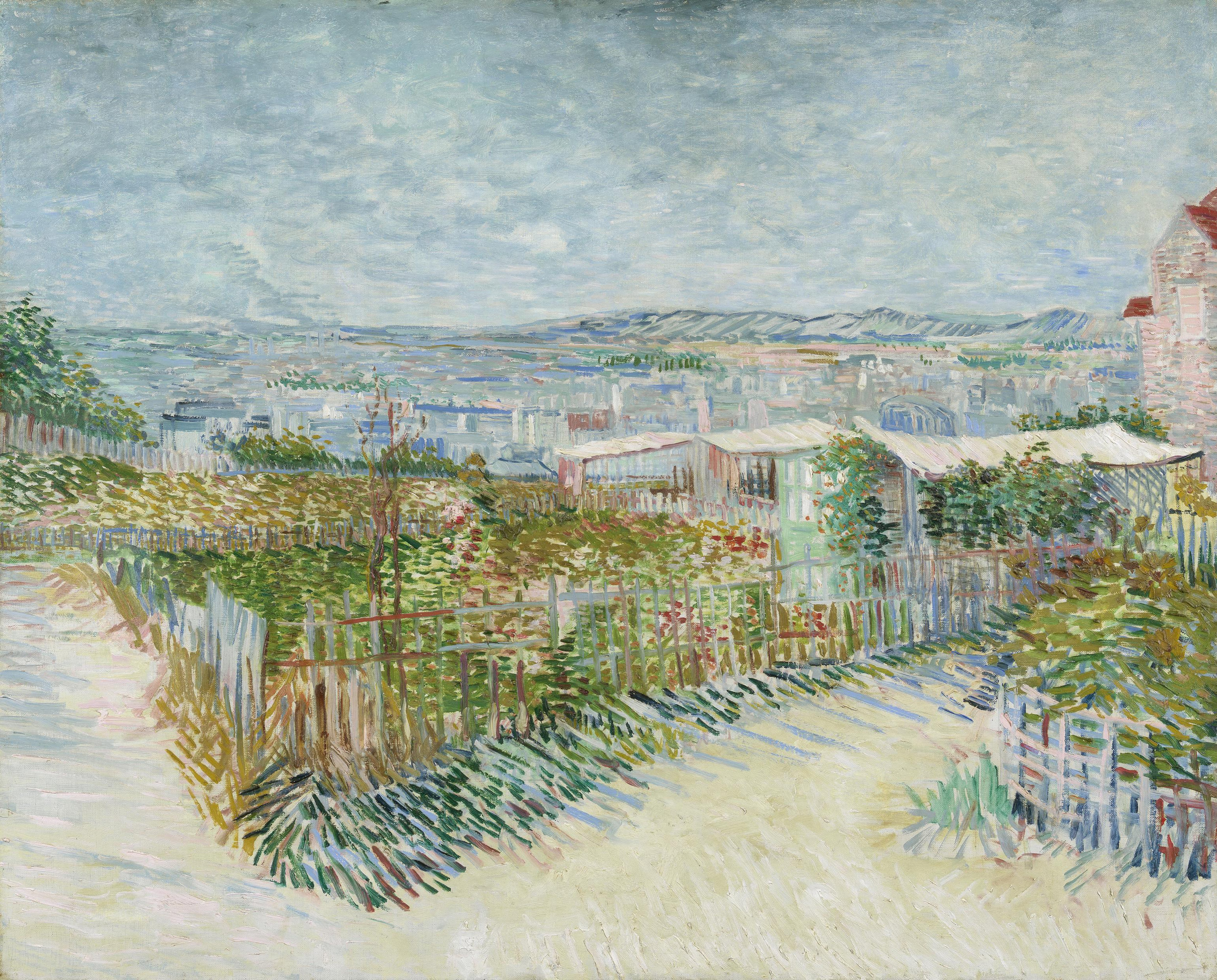
Vegetable Gardens in Montmartre: La Butte Montmartre
1887
Van Gogh Museum, Amsterdam (F316)

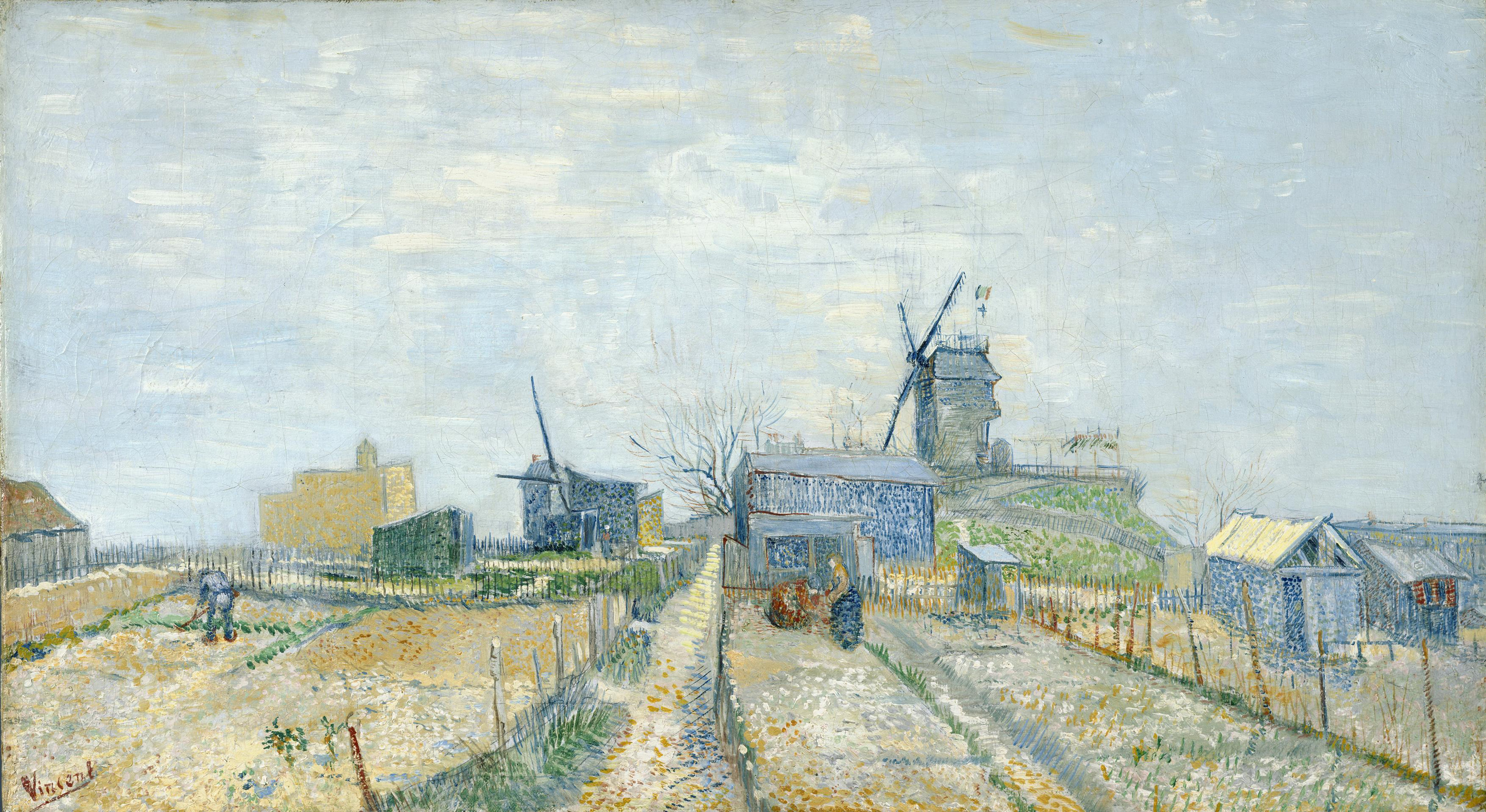
Vegetable Gardens in Montmartre: La Butte Montmartre
1887
Van Gogh Museum, Amsterdam (F346)

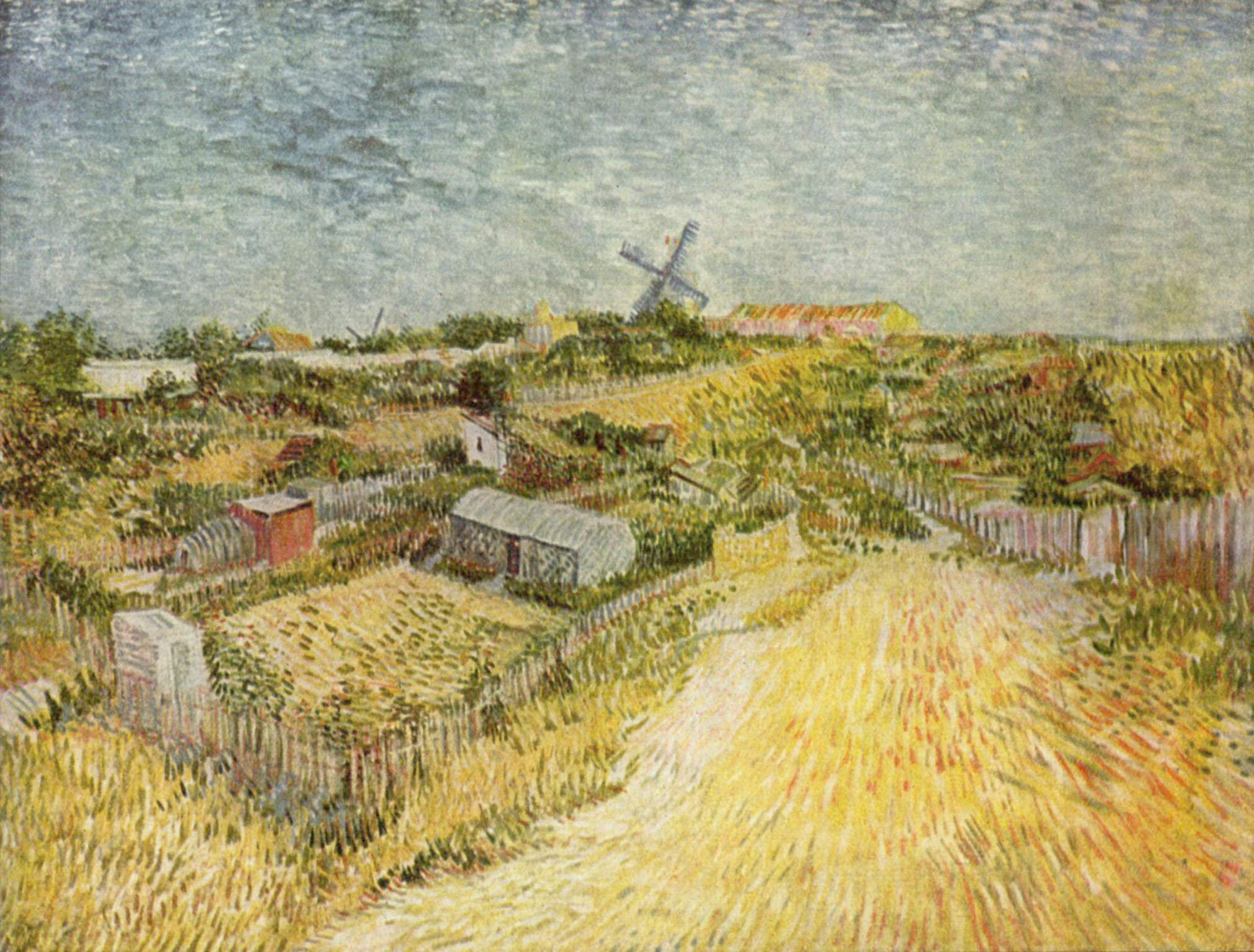
Vegetable Gardens in Montmartre: La Butte Montmartre
1887
Stedelijk Museum, Amsterdam (F350)

=== View from Vincent's Room ===
Van Gogh lived with his brother in Montmartre. Located above the city of Paris, the apartment afforded him a beautiful view of the city skyline, which he painted several times. Two of the paintings were made in 1887. The second painting View from Vincent's window was made from a similar vantage point to the titled painting View of Paris from Vincent's Room in the Rue Lepic of this article.

In View of Paris (F341) Van Gogh demonstrates several Neo-impressionist techniques. To bring an intensity to his work, he uses complementary colors of red and green. He adapted the stippling technique, using tiny dots in areas where needed for detail and brush strokes for the background.

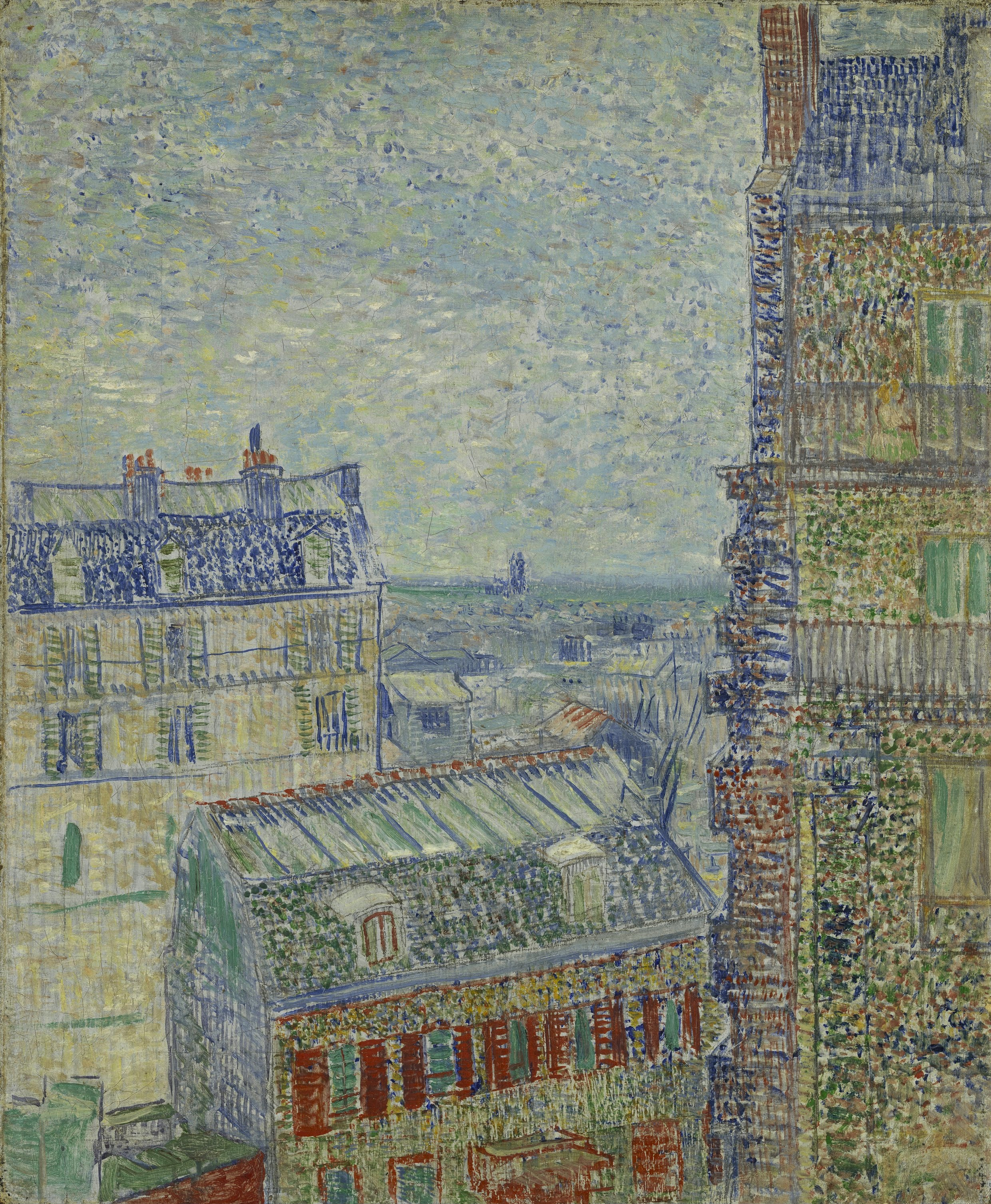
View of Paris from Vincent's Room in the Rue Lepic
1887
Van Gogh Museum, Amsterdam (F341)

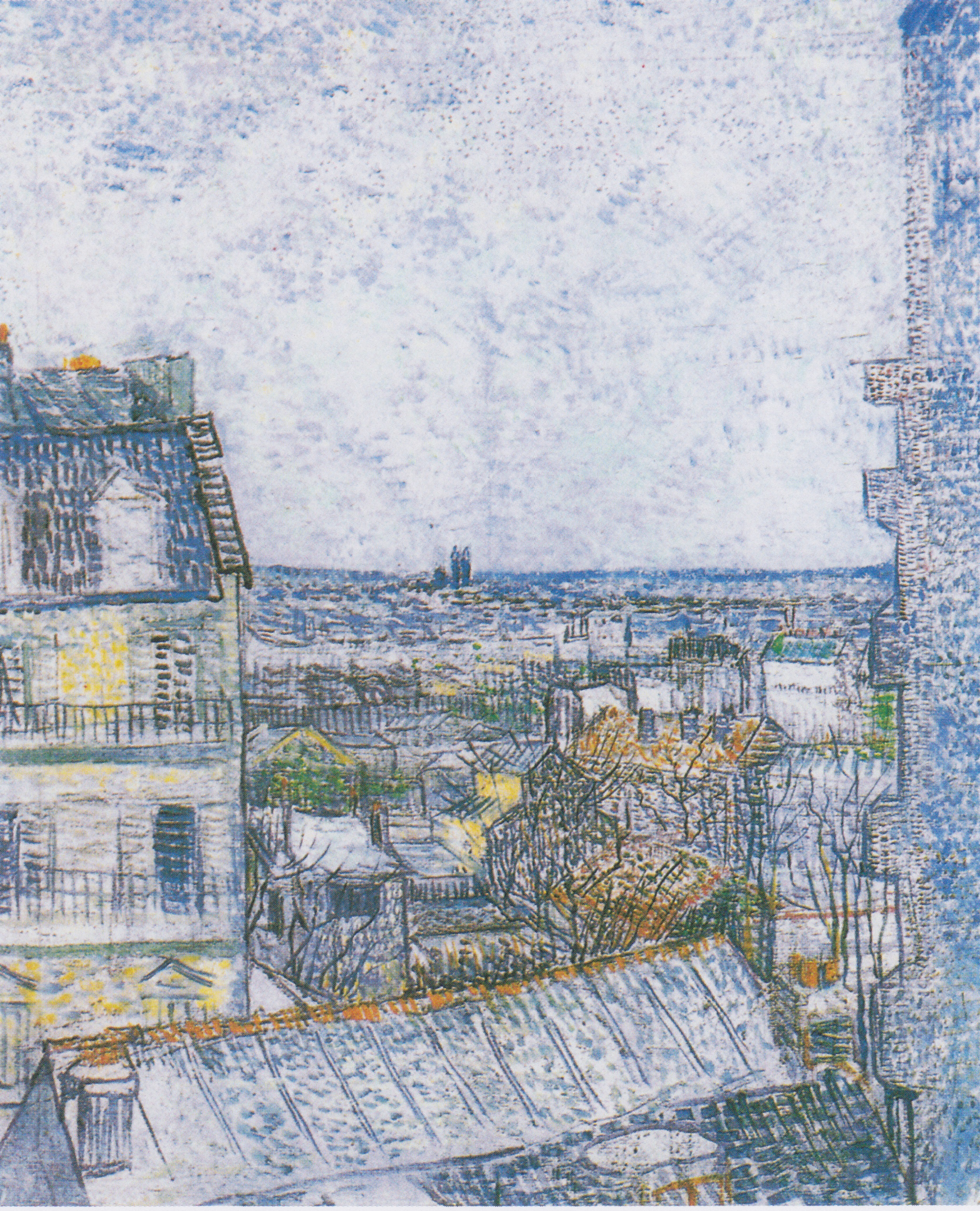
View from Vincent's Window
1887
Private collection (F341a)

=== View of Paris ===
Roofs in Paris (F231) was made by Van Gogh in 1886, his first year in Paris. Although acquainted with Impressionism, he had not yet begun to integrate color and light into his work. This painting consists of dull brown and gray. Here Van Gogh seemed most interested in the variations of colors found in the many houses within his view.

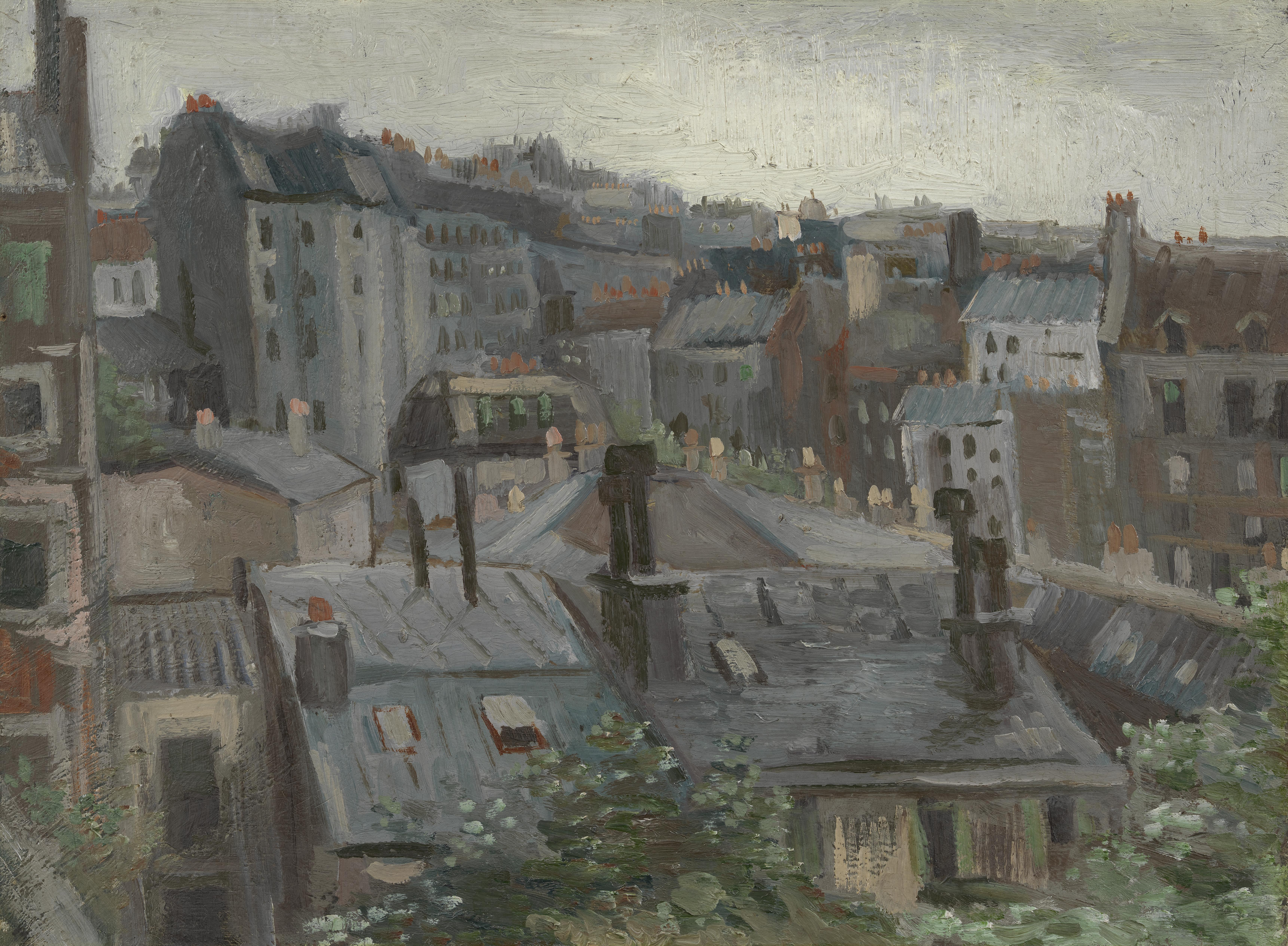
View of the Roofs of Paris
1886
Van Gogh Museum, Amsterdam (F231)

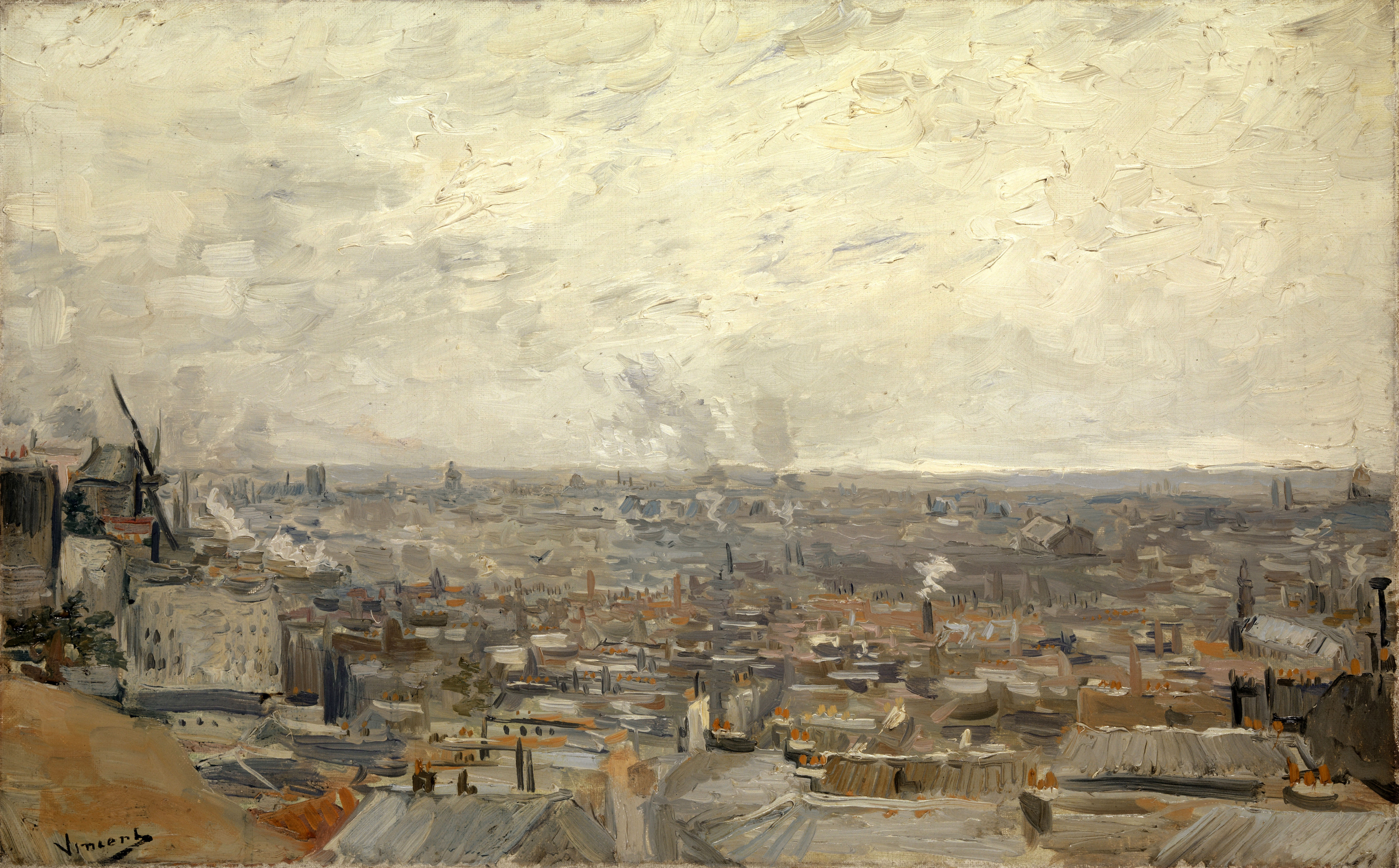
View of Paris from Montmartre
1886
Kunstmuseum Basel, Basel, Switzerland (F262)

== See also ==
- List of works by Vincent van Gogh

== Bibliography ==
- Galbally, A (2008). A remarkable friendship: Vincent van Gogh and John Peter Russell. Carlton, Victoria: Melbourne University Publishing. ISBN 978-0-522-85376-6.
- Hamilton, V; Kelvingrove Museum and Art Gallery (2002). Millet to Matisse: Nineteenth- and Twentieth-century French painting from. New Haven and London: Yale University Press with Glasgow Museums. ISBN 0-902752-65-0.
- Mroue, H (1999). Frommer's Memorable Walks in Paris. Hoboken: Wiley Publishing Inc. ISBN 0-471-77648-3.
- Wallace, R (1969). Editors of Time-Life Books. ed. The World of Van Gogh (1853–1890). Alexandria, VA, USA: Time-Life Books.
