= The Repose =

Painting by Jean-Baptiste-Camille Corot

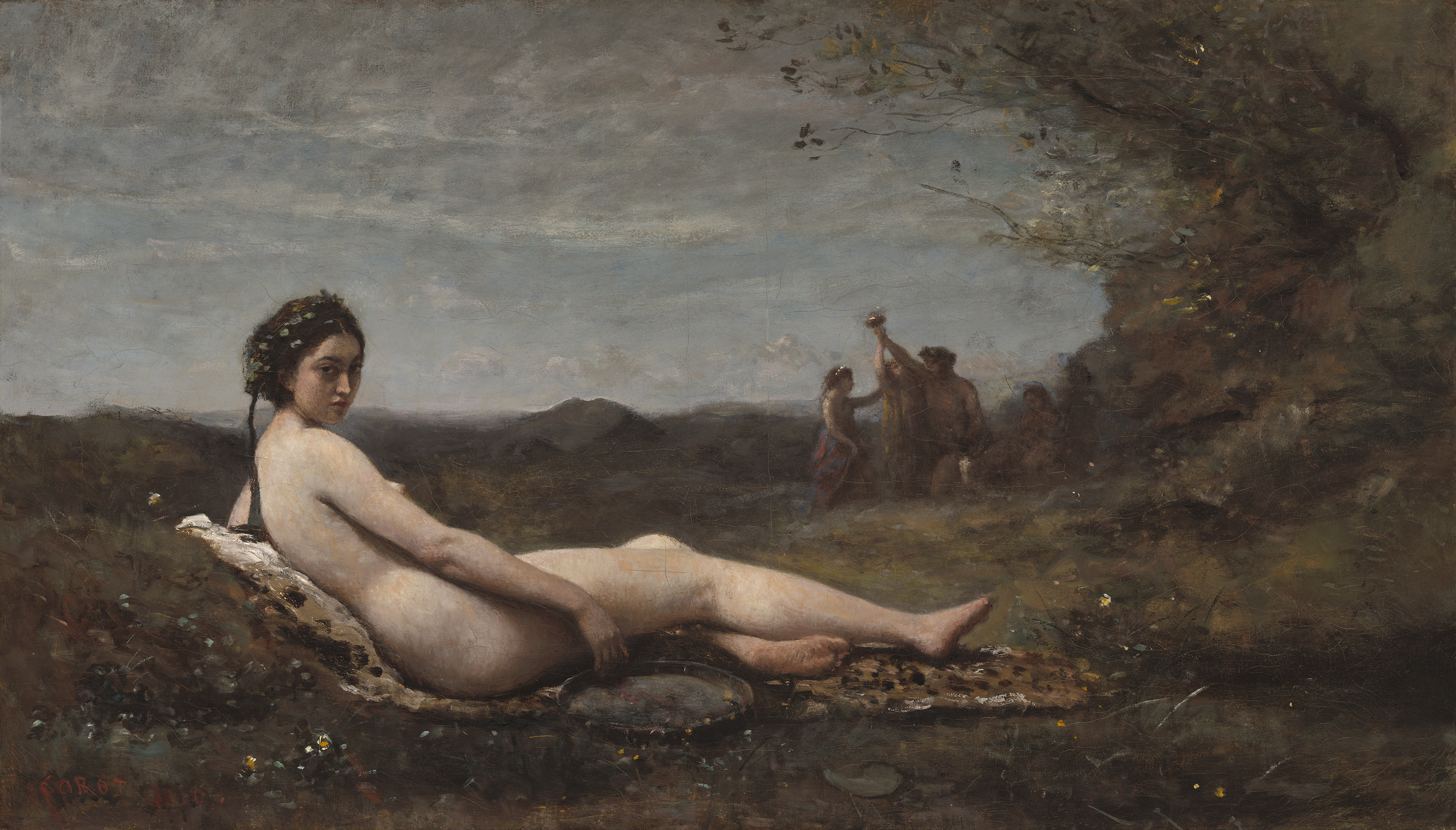
- Artist: Jean-Baptiste-Camille Corot
- Year: 1860
- Type: Oil on canvas, landscape painting
- Dimensions: 57.8 cm × 101.6 cm (22.8 in × 40.0 in)
- Location: National Gallery of Art; Washington, D.C.

The Repose is an oil painting on canvas by the French artist Jean-Baptiste-Camille Corot, from 1860. It is held at the National Gallery of Art, in Washington D.C..

== History and description ==
It features the Italian model Agostina Segatori as a nude woman with garlanded reclining in a landscape.

It was one of a number of paintings Corot made of female nudes in dreamlike outdoor settings. This nude depicts a young woman reclining on a panther skin, set against a landscape. Seen in her right profile, she turns to look directly at the viewer. In doing so, her posture evokes the figure of La Grande Odalisque, by Jean-Auguste-Dominique Ingres, who reappears here wearing a wreath of foliage and standing near an overturned tambourine. She is undoubtedly a bacchante enjoying a moment of respite while, further behind her, the bacchanalian revelry continues.

It was exhibited at the Salon of 1861 in Paris. Today the painting is in the National Gallery of Art, in Washington D.C., after being acquired in 2014, having previously been part of the collection of the city's Corcoran Gallery of Art.

== Bibliography ==
- Coyle, Laura & Hartwell, Dare Myers. Antiquities to Impressionism. Corcoran Gallery of Art, 2001.
- Fried, Michael. French Suite: A Book of Essays. Reaktion Books, 2022.
