= Café du Tambourin =

Café in Paris in the 19th century

Coordinates: 48.8834°N 2.3347°E

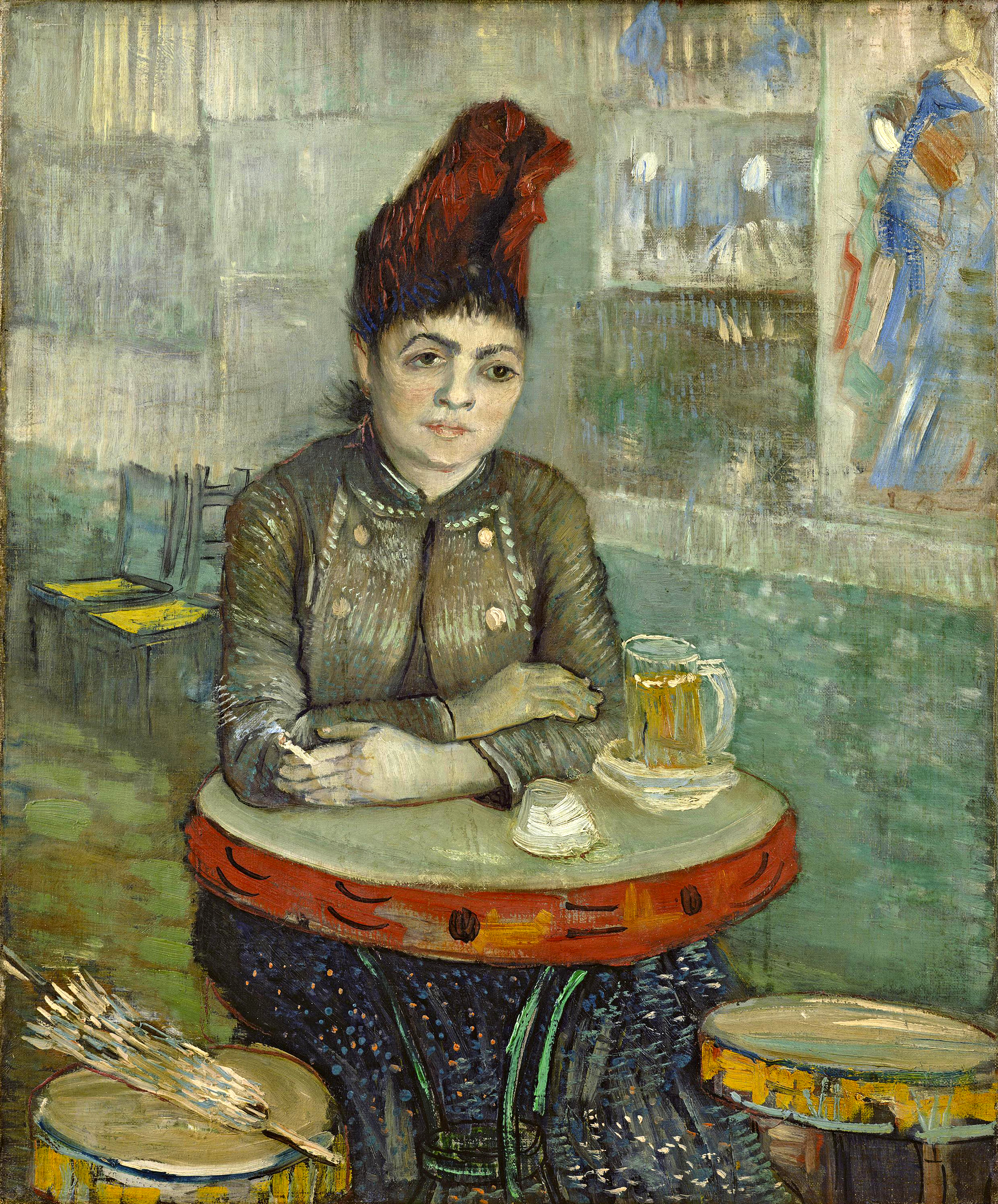
Vincent van Gogh, Agostina Segatori Sitting in the Café du Tambourin, 1887-1888, Van Gogh Museum

Café du Tambourin was a restaurant in Paris, France. Owned by Agostina Segatori, it was opened in December 1883 at 27 rue de Richelieu, and then in March 1885 relocated at 62 Boulevard de Clichy. Famous painter, Jules Chéret, made a poster for the Cabaret at the reopening. The Café had an original decor in which Segatori hung works given to her by Edourd Dantan.

The cafe was frequented by the friends of Dantan and Van Gogh. In 1887, Henri de Toulouse-Lautrec possibly created his 1887 portrait of Van Gogh at the Café du Tambourin. The café was also frequently visited by writers and art critics such as author Sophie de Juvigny. The Café Tambourin was the location of Van Gogh's first exhibition in Paris, probably only still lifes of flowers. In March 1887 Segatori and Van Gogh presented a collection of Japanese prints acquired by the artist. In July 1887, Van Gogh exhibited his works and those of his friends, Paul Gauguin, Louis Anquetin and Émile Bernard. At this exhibition, Émile Bernard and Louis Anquetin sold their work for the first time.

Later, the Café du Tambourin went bankrupt, and was renamed the Cabaret de la Butte in 1893 and then the Cabaret des Quat'z'Arts at the end of the century.
