= Agostina Segatori =

French model

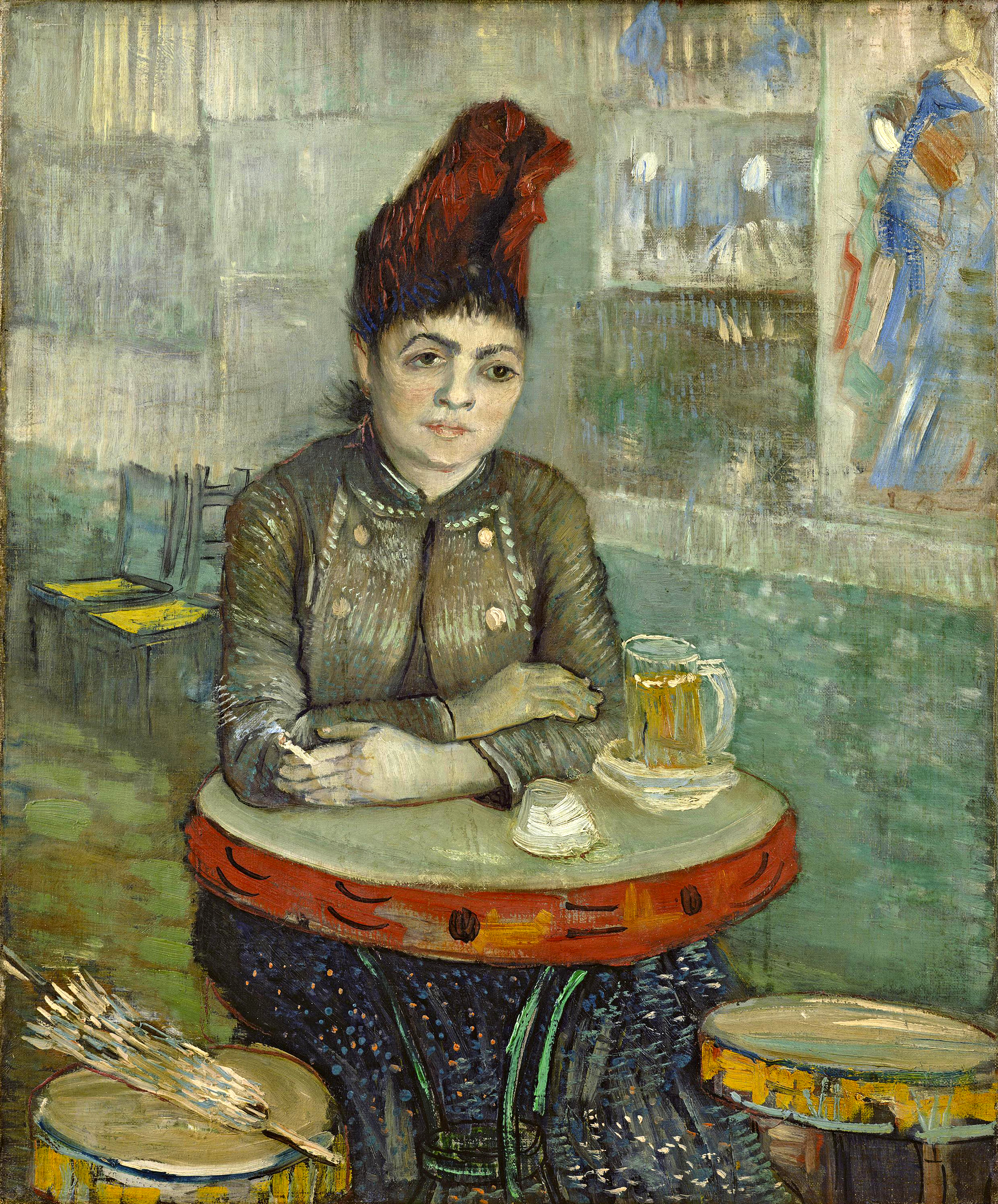
Vincent van Gogh, Agostina Segatori Sitting in the Café du Tambourin (1887–88; Van Gogh Museum).

Agostina Segatori (Ancona, 1841 - 1910, Paris) was the niece of Fortunata Segatori and a model who posed for painters in Paris, France, such as Édouard Joseph Dantan, Jean-Baptiste-Camille Corot, Jean-Léon Gérôme, Eugène Delacroix, Vincent van Gogh and Édouard Manet. She is also known for running the Café du Tambourin in Paris.

== Biography ==
Segatori was born in the Italian city of Ancona. In 1860 she posed for Manet and in 1873 for Corot.

On the 12th of October, 1861, she married in Rome (Italy) Pierre Gustave Morière who was born in Almenêches, a village in the Normandy region. They split up without divorcing and Agostina Segatori met the Parisian painter Edouard Dantan in 1872, with whom she lived in a stormy relationship until 1884. Agostina had in June 1873 a child by Dantan named Jean-Pierre Segatori. The husband Pierre Morière died in September 1879 in his home of Déville-les-Rouen.

More than four years after his death, Agostina Segatori had the paternity of her son attributed (wrongly) to her late husband by a Paris court.

In 1874, she was depicted by Edouard Dantan in the first work that he exhibited at the Salon, a wax medallion. During the summers of 1874, 1875 and 1877, Agostina Segatori posed many times for Dantan.

Agostina Segatori is not only known for being the mistress of Edouard Dantan, she was the proprietress of the Café Tambourin, at 62 Boulevard de Clichy in Paris. Segatori's Café du Tambourin was originally located at 27 rue de Richelieu in Paris, before reopening at 62 Boulevard de Clichy; Jules Chéret made a poster for the Cabaret at the reopening. The decor included works offered to her by Edouard Dantan, but also featured those by Vincent van Gogh. In 1887, Henri de Toulouse-Lautrec created a portrait of Vincent van Gogh at the Café.

Agostina Segatori became famous for her relationship in the spring of 1887 with Vincent van Gogh, who lived in Paris from 1886 until 1888. There is little information on this relationship as Vincent van Gogh lived with his brother during this time, and there is thus very little correspondence between the brothers from this period. However Agostina Segatori was cited in two letters by the painter. Information on the relationship was related by one of the closest friends of Vincent van Gogh, the painter Émile Bernard in an article he wrote on Pere Tanguy, an important Parisian character in the 19th century. It seems that Vincent van Gogh and Agostina Segatori were very fond of each other, and she inspired the painter, who made two portraits of her and several nudes in oil.

Agostina Segatori gave Vincent van Gogh's first exhibition at her Café Tambourin. Their relationship quickly became stormy and they decided by mutual agreement to separate in July 1887. After this separation, Agostina Segatori improperly retained works by Van Gogh in her Café.

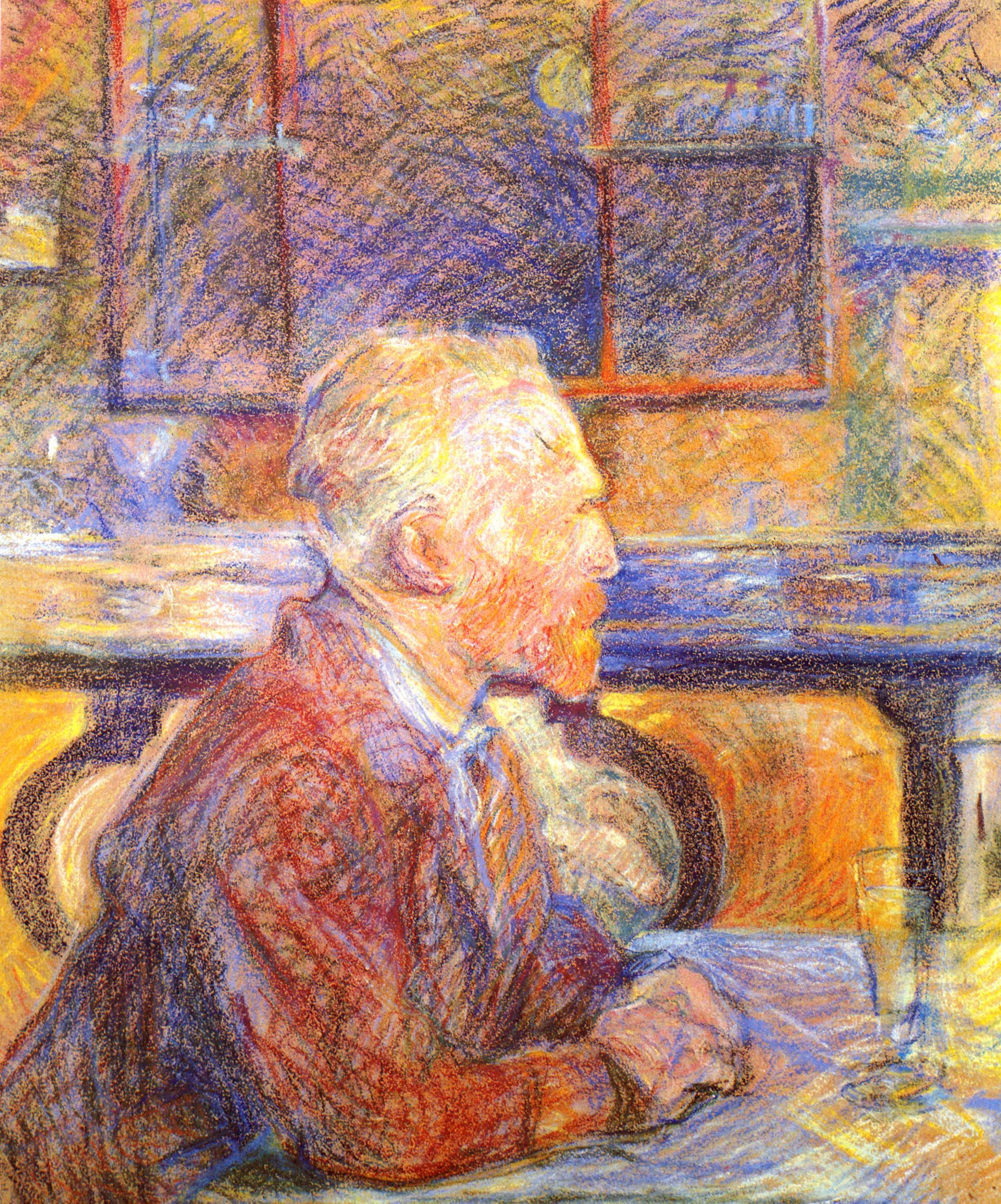
Henri de Toulouse-Lautrec (1864–1901), Portrait of Vincent van Gogh, 1887

Agostina Segatori died in Paris in 1910 after experiencing a number of setbacks including the loss of her Café. She was buried in the Saint-Ouen Cemetery in the North of Paris.

== Representations of Segatori in French art of the nineteenth century ==
Agostina was a famous model. In 1860, she posed for Manet, who painted her portrait known as The Italian. This work, now held in a private collection in New York, was sold by the merchant Alphonse Portier to Alexander Cassatt, brother of Mary Cassatt. She then posed twice for the painter Jean-Baptiste-Camille Corot. The first work is called The Picture of Agostina and the second the Bacchante with tambourines. She was also painted by Jean-Léon Gérôme. Vincent van Gogh created two portraits of Agostina Segatori, one named The woman with the tambourine and the other the Italian.

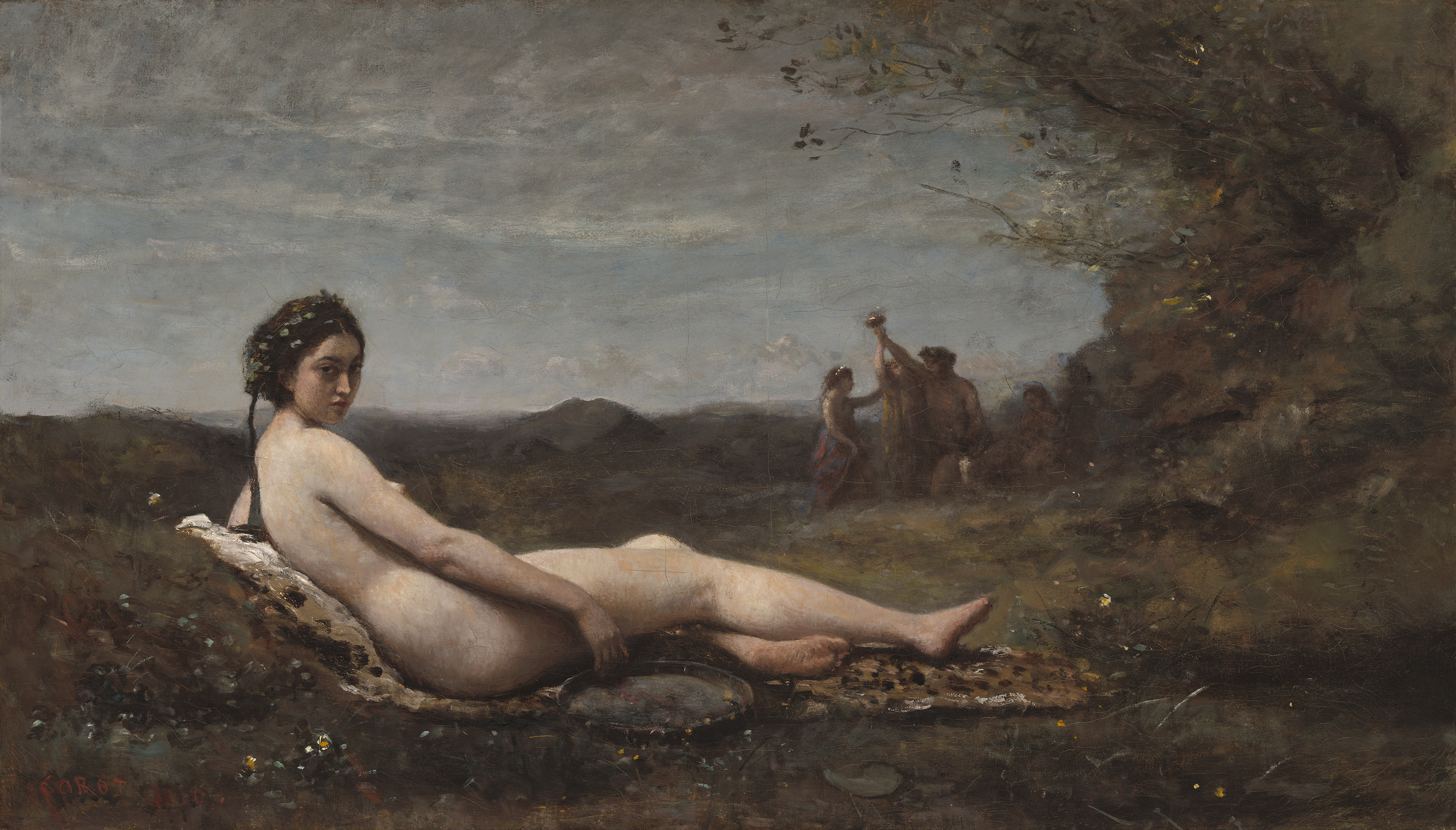
The Repose by Jean-Baptiste-Camille Corot,

Jean-Baptiste-Camille Corot, Agostina, the Italian, 1866

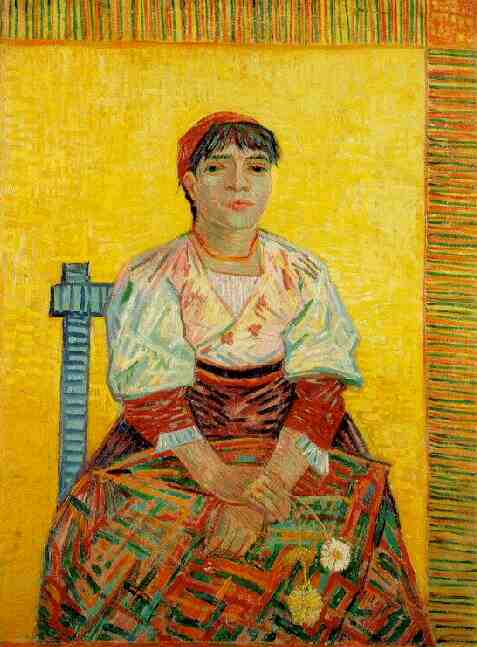
Vincent van Gogh, Portrait of an Italian woman, 1887
