= Agostina Segatori Sitting in the Café du Tambourin =

1887 painting by Vincent van Gogh

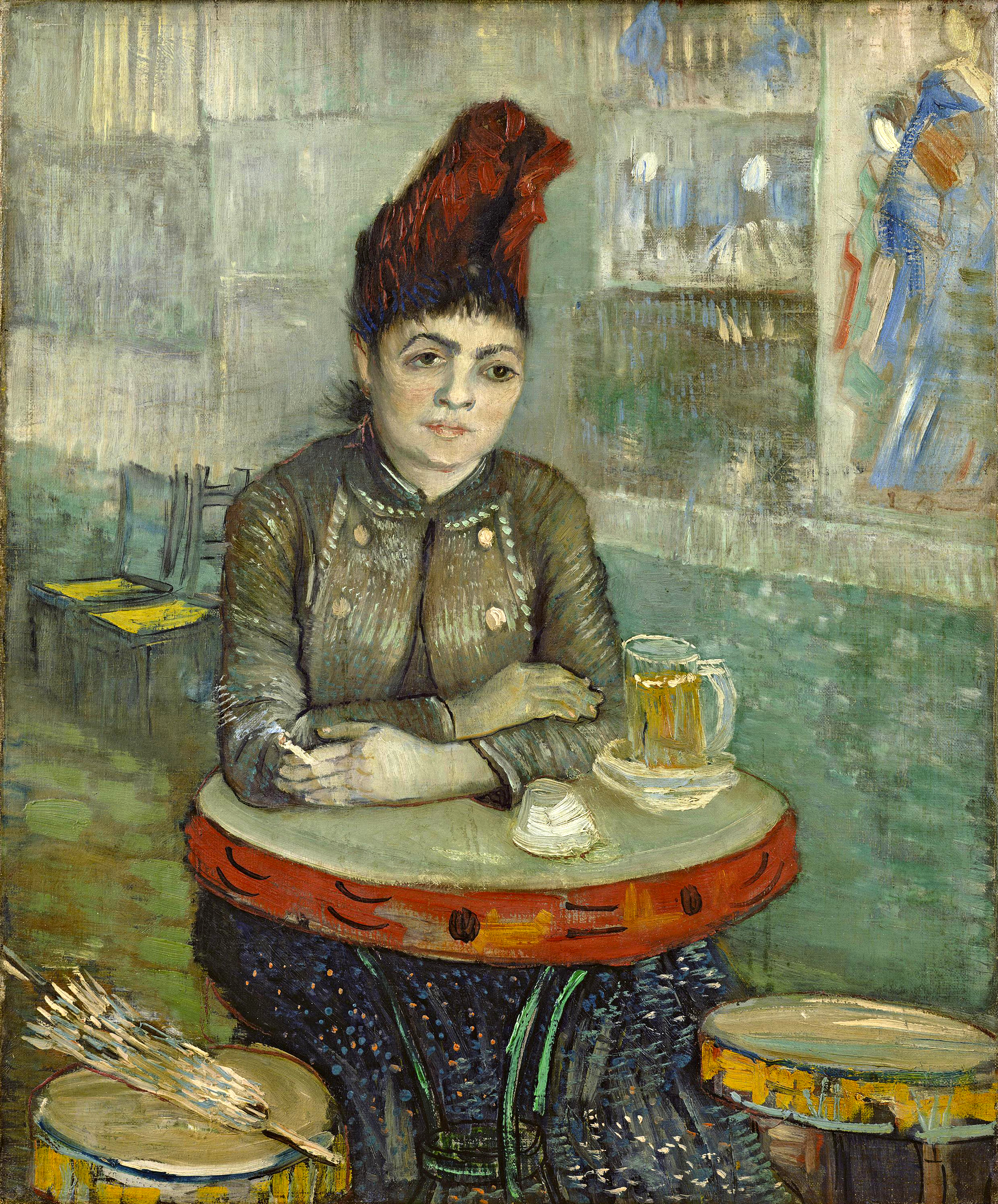
- Artist: Vincent van Gogh
- Year: 1887
- Catalogue: F370; JH1208
- Medium: Oil on canvas
- Dimensions: 55.5 cm × 46.5 cm (21.9 in × 18.3 in)
- Location: Van Gogh Museum; Amsterdam, Netherlands

Van Gogh Museum's senior researcher Louis van Tilborgh talks about the lesser known aspects of this painting.

Agostina Segatori Sitting in the Café du Tambourin was painted by Vincent van Gogh in 1887. Agostina Segatori owned the Café du Tambourin that Van Gogh knew intimately. It was a gathering spot for Parisian artists, a place where their work was exhibited. Van Gogh, unable to pay in cash for his meals, exchanged paintings for his fare. The paintings then adorned the restaurant. He held a special exhibit of his Japanese prints in the café as well. His connection with Agostina and the cafe came to a sad end when she went bankrupt and van Gogh's paintings were confiscated by creditors. This painting, however, demonstrates an artistic discovery that culminated in his unique, creative style not quite on the brink of being understood and revered.

== Van Gogh's influence in Paris ==
In 1886 van Gogh left the Netherlands, never to return, for Paris and the guidance of his brother Theo. He entered Paris as a shy, somber man and while his personality would never change, he emerged artistically into what one critic described as a "singing bird". While van Gogh had been influenced by great Dutch masters, coming to Paris meant that he was influenced by Impressionists, Symbolists, Pointillists, and Japanese prints. His circle of friends included Camille Pissarro, Henri Toulouse-Lautrec, Paul Gauguin, Émile Bernard and others. The works of Japanese artists Hiroshige and Hokusai greatly influenced van Gogh, both for the beautiful subject matter and the style of flat patterns of colors without shadow. Van Gogh explored the various influences and molded them into a style that was uniquely his own. In the years 1886 to 1888, van Gogh emerged as a sophisticated, thoughtful and provoking artist. This painting demonstrates his journey of creativity in that period.

== The painting ==
In the painting Agostina, a woman in her forties, can be seen smoking a cigarette while having her second glass of beer, evidenced by two saucers under the mug of beer. In demeanor and style, such as her clothing, make-up and hairstyle, she is a modern woman. She is wearing a fashionable hat. According to the style at the time, her jacket is a different design than her dress. A parasol sits on one of the seats next to her.

Van Gogh used the theme of a woman sitting at a small table, introduced by Impressionists, such as Edgar Degas and Édouard Manet. The table and stools were in the shape of tambourines, befitting the café's theme. On the wall behind her are van Gogh's Japanese prints, which he began exhibiting at the café in February 1887.

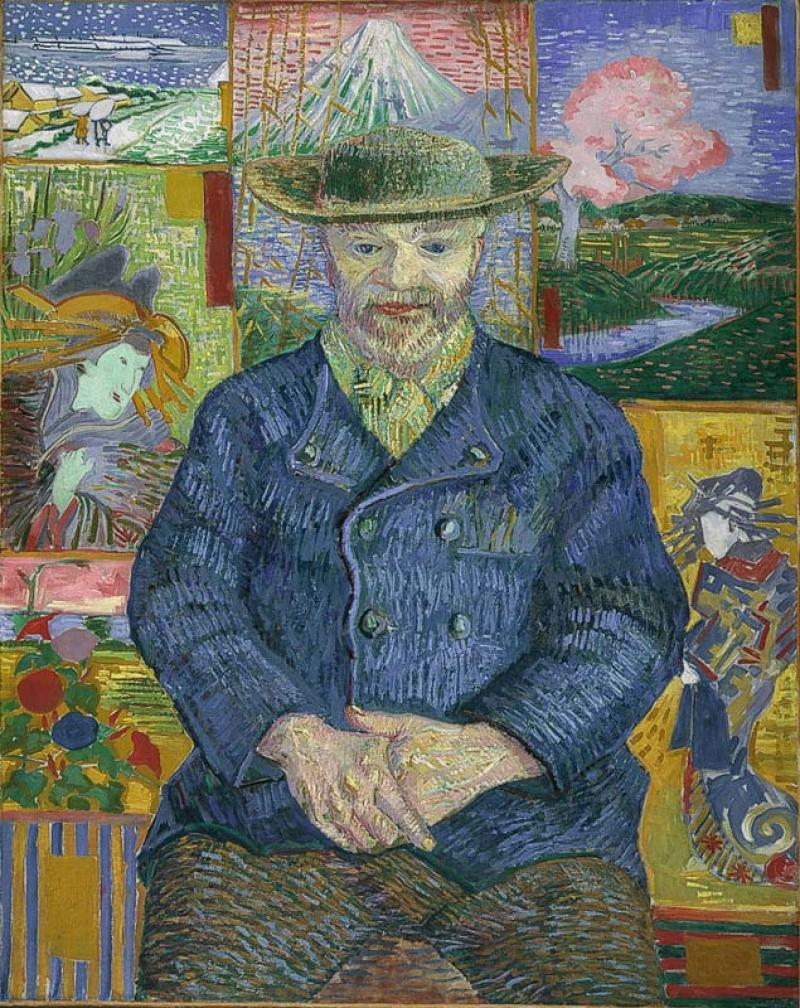
Portrait of Père Tanguy, 1887

The brightly colored painting and confident subject represent a shift in Van Gogh's attitude in comparison to his earlier subjects, such as his dark and tragic peasants. Even more, van Gogh's Portrait of Père Tanguy from the fall of the same year further explores his use of color and better promotes his Japanese prints.

== Café du Tambourin ==
Van Gogh occasionally visited Café du Tambourin run by Agostina Segatori, the subject of this painting. Previously an artist's model to Manet, Corot and others, the Naples-born Agostina saved the money she earned working as a model and opened the Italian-themed Café du Tambourin in 1885, which particularly catered to artists.

The café on the Boulevard de Clichy in Paris was just around the corner from the home that Vincent lived in with his brother Theo. Besides convenience, the restaurant was notable to Van Gogh as a venue for exhibition of his paintings, a practice initiated by artists such as Henri de Toulouse-Lautrec, Paul-Albert Besnard and others.

In 1887 van Gogh had several meals a week at the café which were paid in paintings to adorn the restaurant's walls. He fell in love with Agostina who was twelve years older. Soon after, though, Agostina and the establishment fell on hard times. She became ill and the business, in debt and likely involved in illegal prostitution, failed. Although assured by Agostina that van Gogh could claim his paintings, according to Émile Bernard's recollection, debtors sold them "as waste canvas" in batches of 10, ranging in price from 50 centimes to one franc per bundle. Due to the bankruptcy of the cafe van Gogh lost not only the paintings, mostly still life works of flowers, but also the frames.

Agostina Segatori Sitting in the Café du Tambourin is on display at the Van Gogh Museum in Amsterdam, the Netherlands.

== See also ==
- Montmartre series, an article about the works that Van Gogh created near the apartment that he shared with his brother and the Café du Tambourin.

== See also ==
- List of works by Vincent van Gogh
