= Portraits by Vincent van Gogh =

Vincent van Gogh lived during the Impressionist era. With the development of photography, painters and artists turned to conveying the feeling and ideas behind people, places, and things rather than trying to imitate their physical forms.

Impressionist artists did this by emphasizing certain hues, using vigorous brushstrokes, and paying attention to highlighting. Vincent van Gogh implemented this ideology to pursue his goal of depicting his own feelings toward and involvement with his subjects.

Van Gogh's portraiture focuses on color and brushstrokes to demonstrate their inner qualities and Van Gogh's own relationship with them.

Vincent van Gogh painted portraits throughout his career from 1881 through 1890.

== The Netherlands and Brussels (1881–1886) ==
Van Gogh was fascinated with making portraits early in his artistic career. He wrote to his brother, Theo while studying in The Hague, "I want to do a drawing that not quite everybody will understand, the figure simplified to the essentials, with a deliberate disregard of those details that do not belong to the actual character and are merely accidental." As an example, he discussed having their parents pose for a painting, but that, in capturing the character of a "poor village clergyman" or "a couple who have grown old together in love and fidelity", they may not appreciate the work, because in doing so the painting would not be an exact likeness. Even so, he considered it a "serious matter" to focus on their character, one where his approach should be trusted.

=== Joseph Blok ===
Van Gogh wrote to his brother Theo in November 1882 that he had drawn a portrait of Jozef Blok (F993), a street bookseller who was sometimes called "Binnenhof's outdoor librarian". Unlike the character studies, the work was detailed in pencil with watercolor and chalk. At this time it was rare for Van Gogh to use color, as he found it difficult to work with (see early works of Vincent van Gogh).

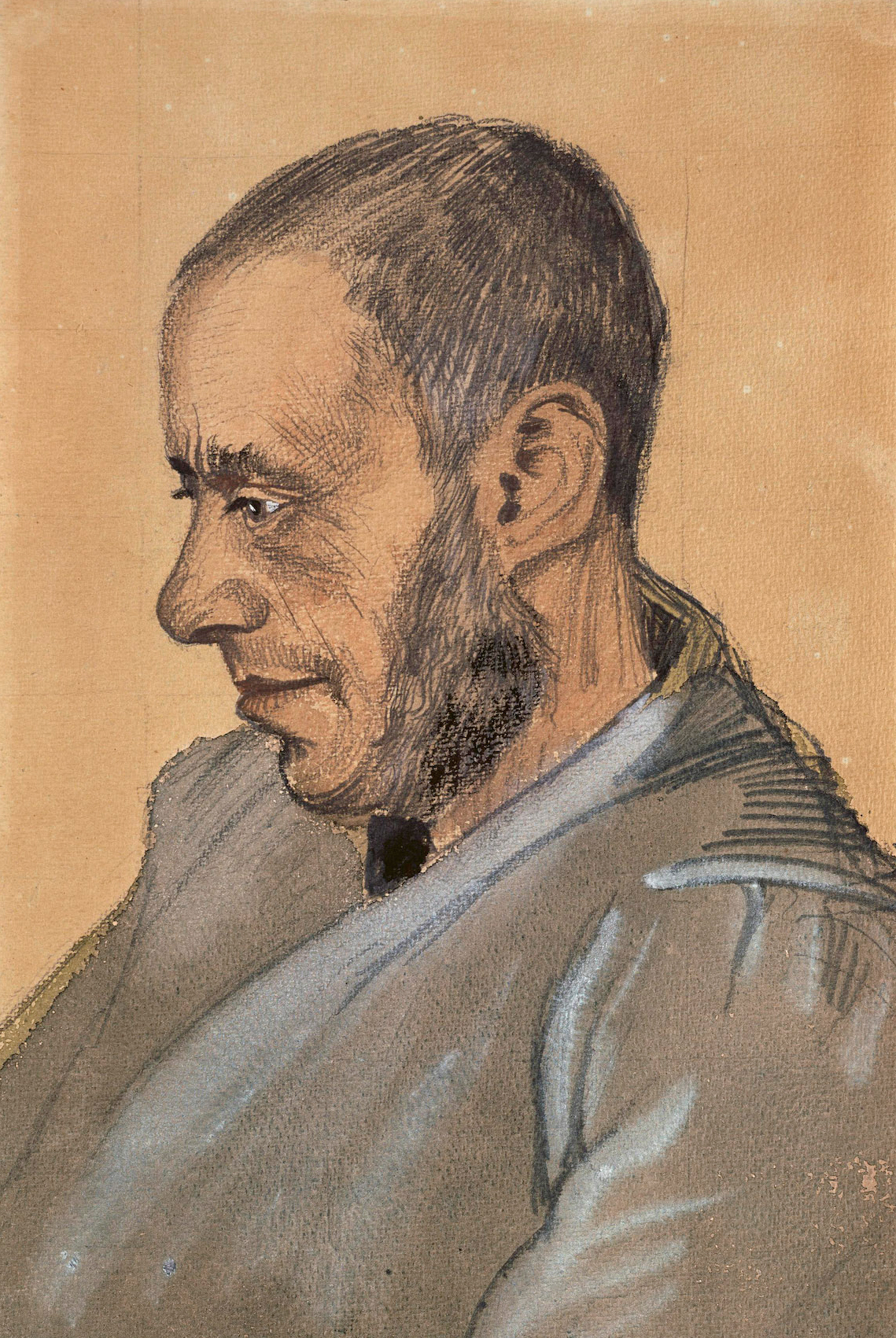
Portrait of Jozef Blok (bookseller), watercolor, 1882, Van Gogh Museum, Amsterdam (F993)

=== Peasant character studies ===
In November 1882, Van Gogh began drawings of individuals to depict a range of character types from the working class. The "peasant genre" that greatly influenced Van Gogh began in the 1840s with the works of Jean-François Millet, Jules Breton, and others. In 1885, Van Gogh described the painting of peasants as the most essential contribution to modern art.

Van Gogh held laborers up to a high standard of how dedicatedly he should approach painting, "One must undertake with confidence, with a certain assurance that one is doing a reasonable thing, like the farmer who drives his plow... (one who) drags the harrow behind himself. If one hasn't a horse, one is one's own horse."

To depicting the essence of the life of the peasant and their spirit, Van Gogh lived as they lived, he was in the fields as they were, enduring the weather or long hours as they were. To do so was not something taught in schools, he noted, and became frustrated by traditionalists who focused on technique more so than the nature of the people being captured. So thoroughly engaged in living the peasant lifestyle, his appearance and manner of speech began to separate himself from others, but this was a cost he believed he needed to bear for his artistic development.

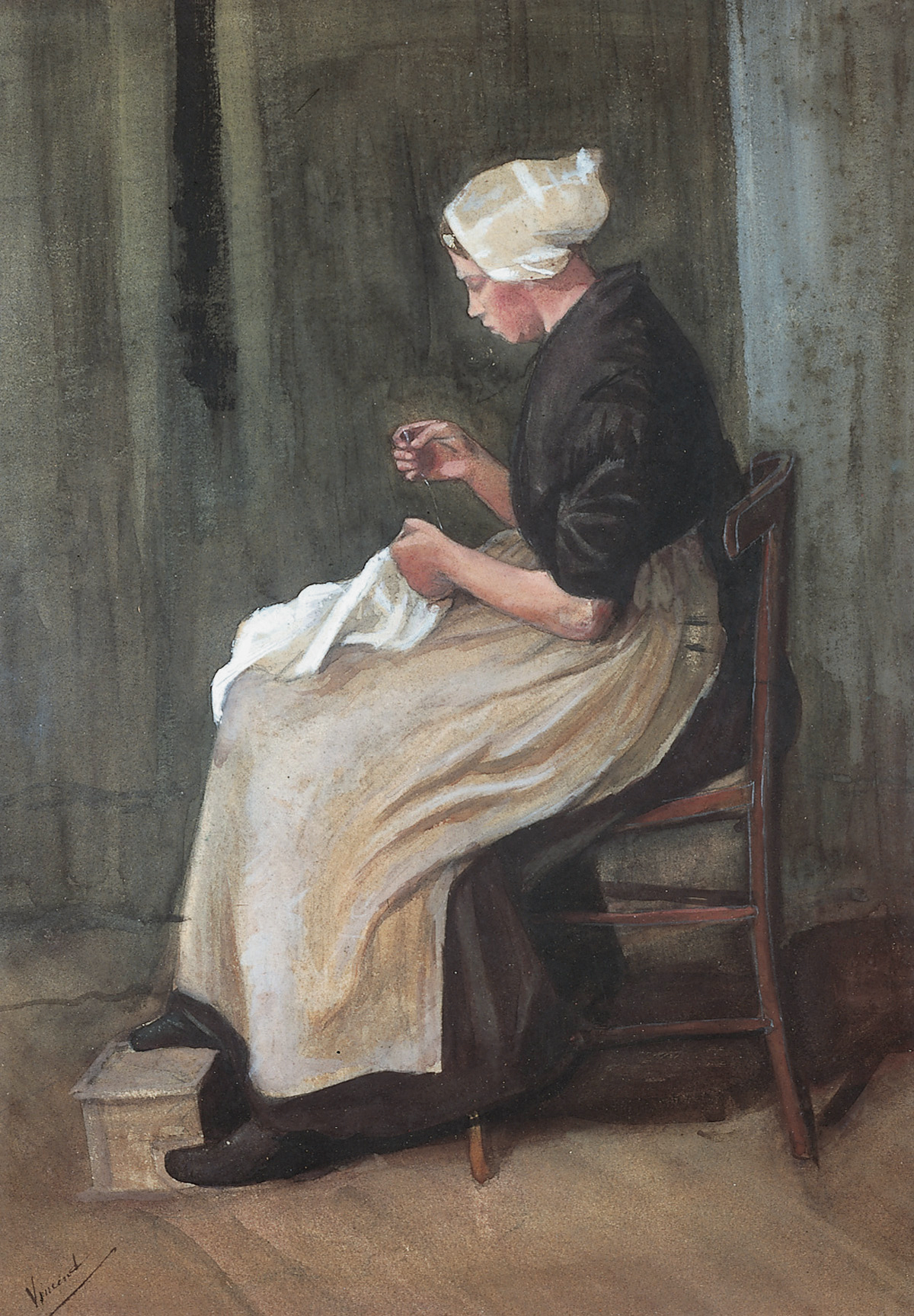
Woman Sewing Watercolor, 1881–82, P. and N. de Boer Foundation, Amsterdam (F869)

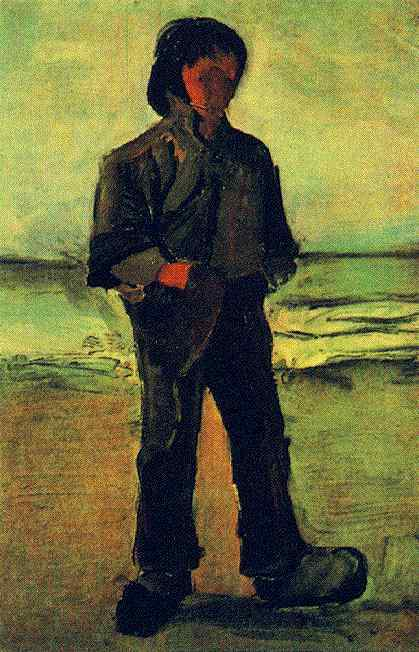
Fisherman on the Beach, 1882, Kröller-Müller Museum, Otterlo (F5)

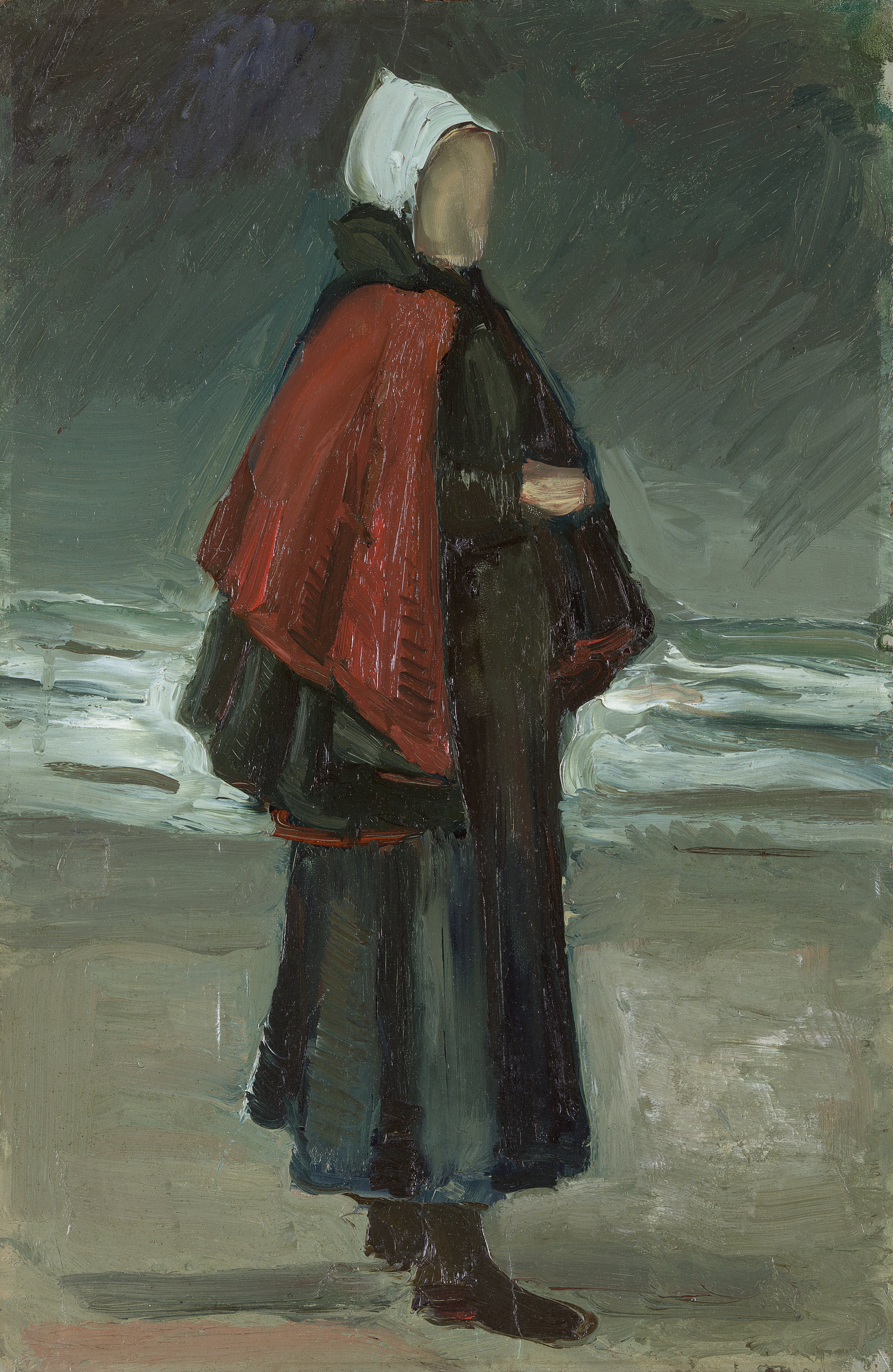
Fisherman's Wife on the Beach, 1882, Kröller-Müller Museum, Otterlo (F6)

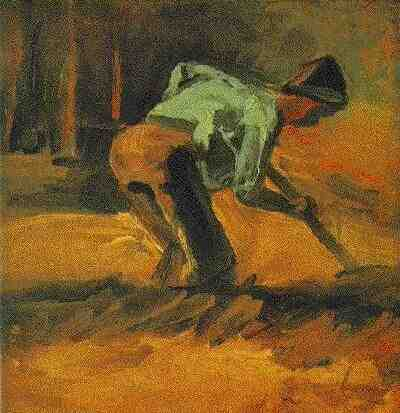
Man Stooping with Stick or Spade, 1882, Kuboso Memorial Museum of Arts, Izumi, Japan (F12)

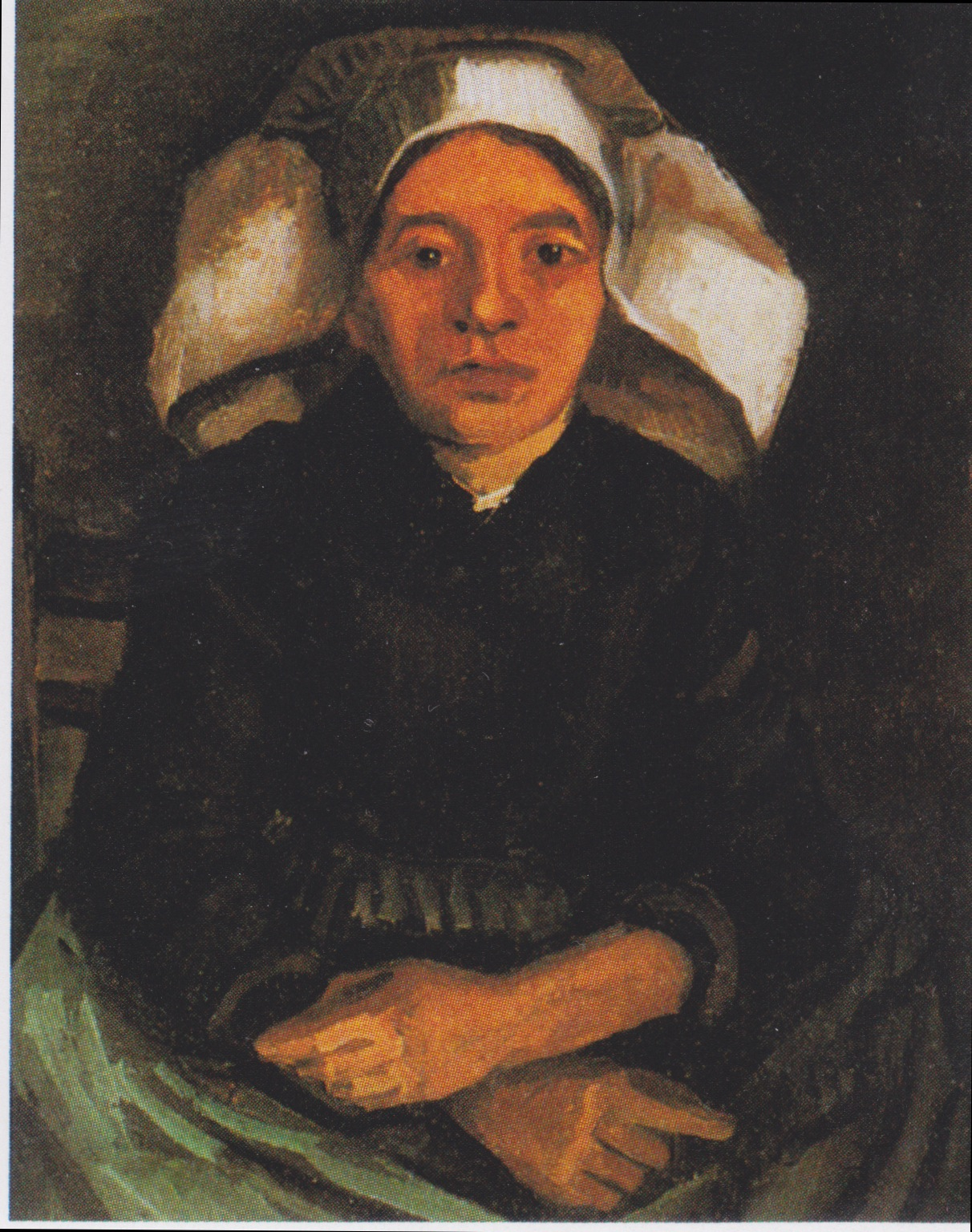
Peasant Woman, Half Figure, Seated with White Cap, 1884, Morohashi Museum of Modern Art, Fukushima, Japan (F143)

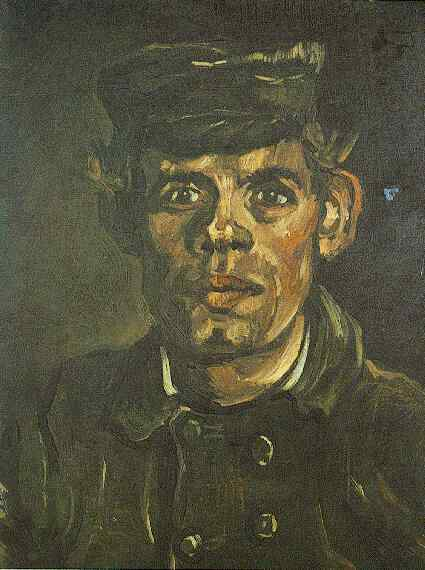
Peasant from Nuenen, 1885 Royal Museums of Fine Arts of Belgium, Brussels (F163)

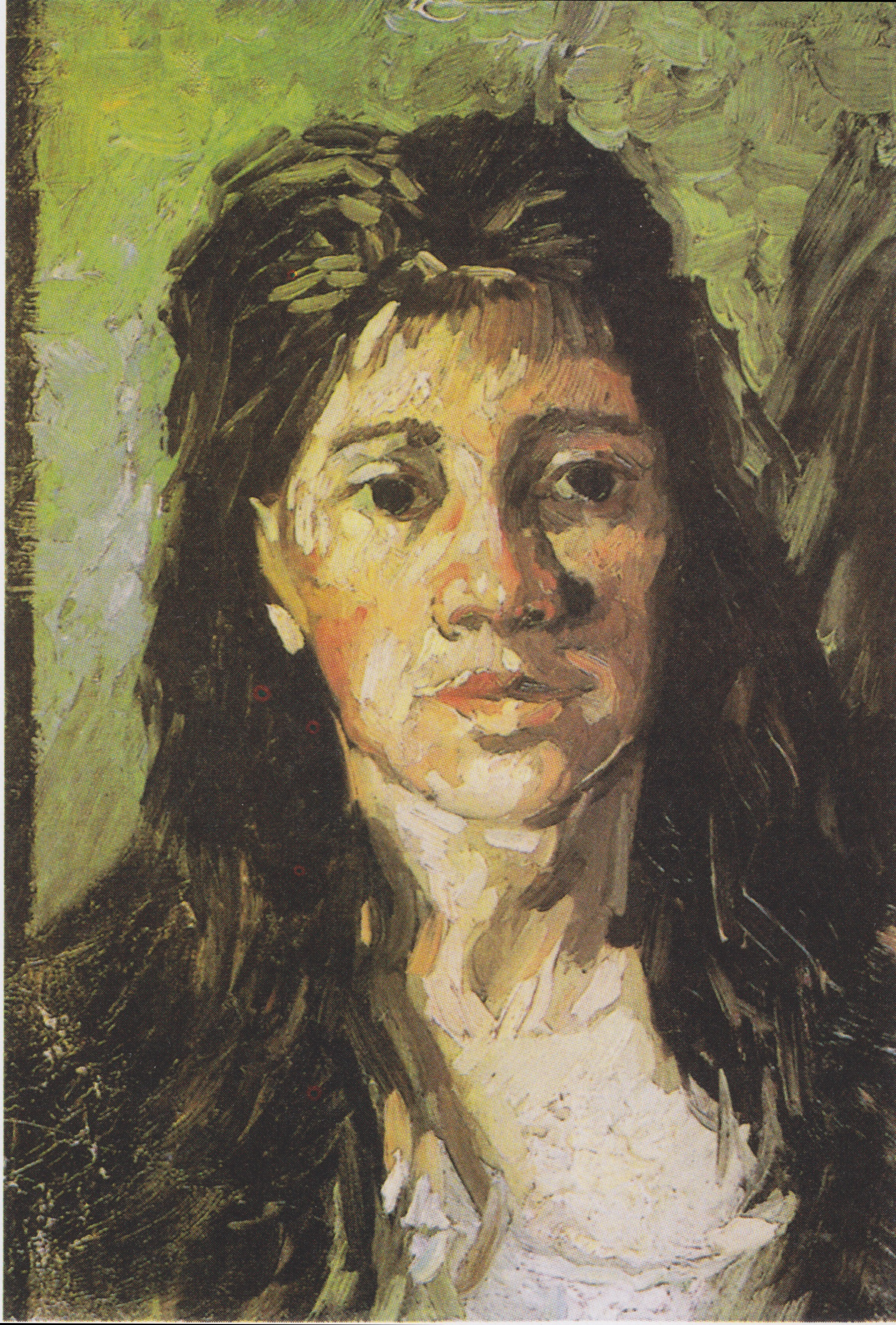
Head of a Woman with her Hair Loose, 1885, Van Gogh Museum, Amsterdam (F206)

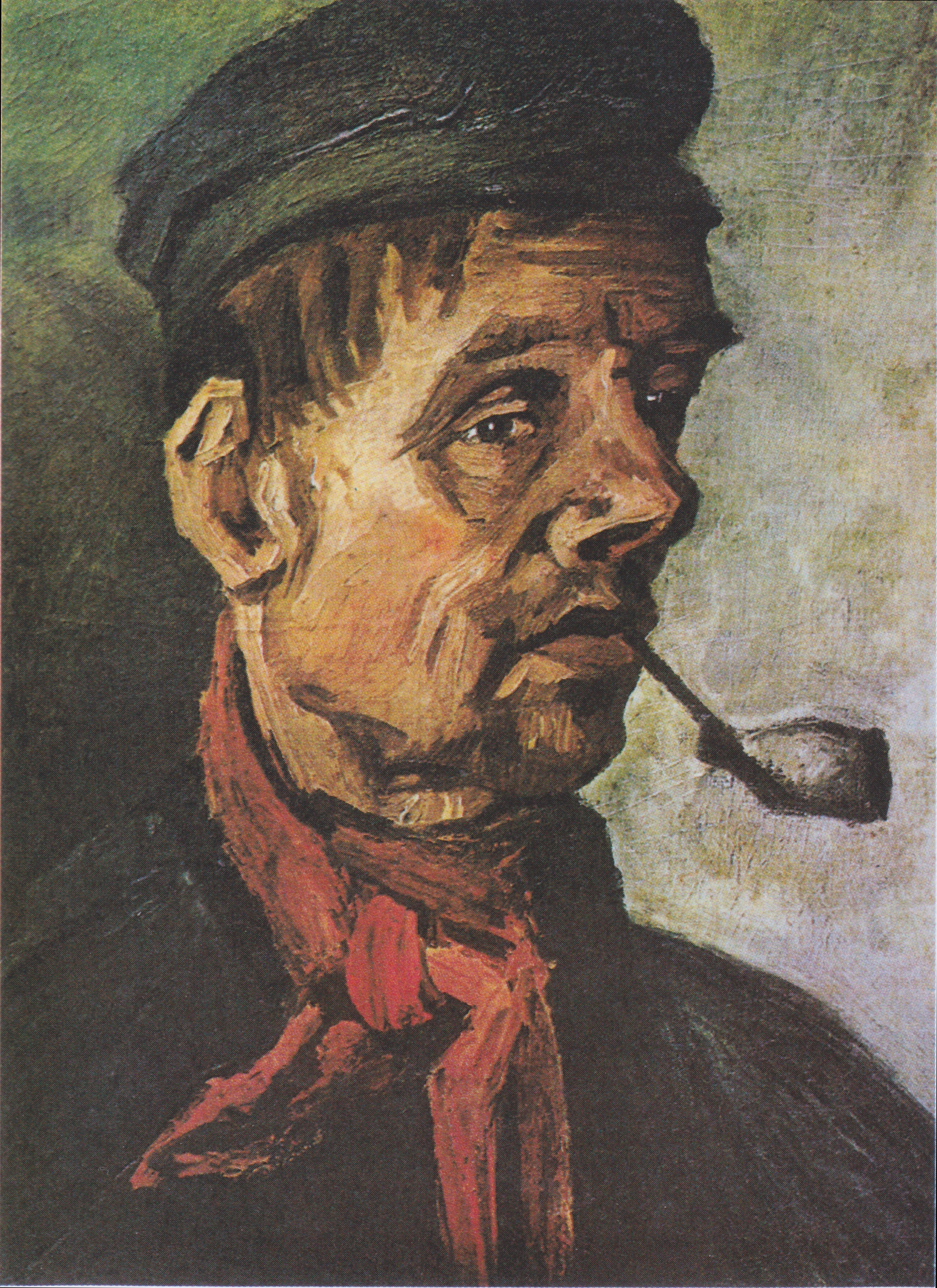
Head of a Man with a Pipe, 1885, Kröller-Müller Museum, Otterlo, Netherlands (F169)

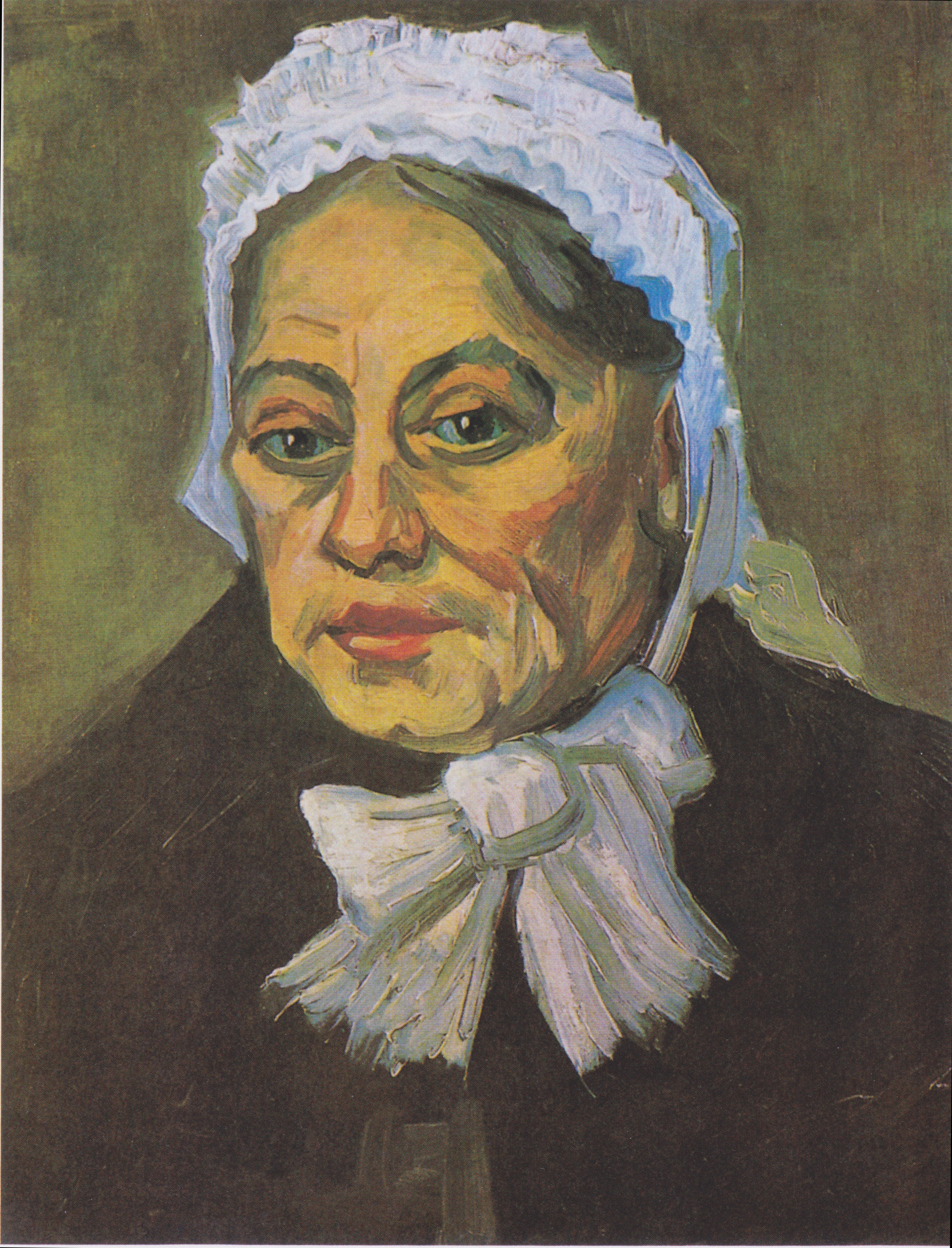
Head of an Old Woman with White Cap (The Midwife), 1885, Van Gogh Museum, Amsterdam (F174)

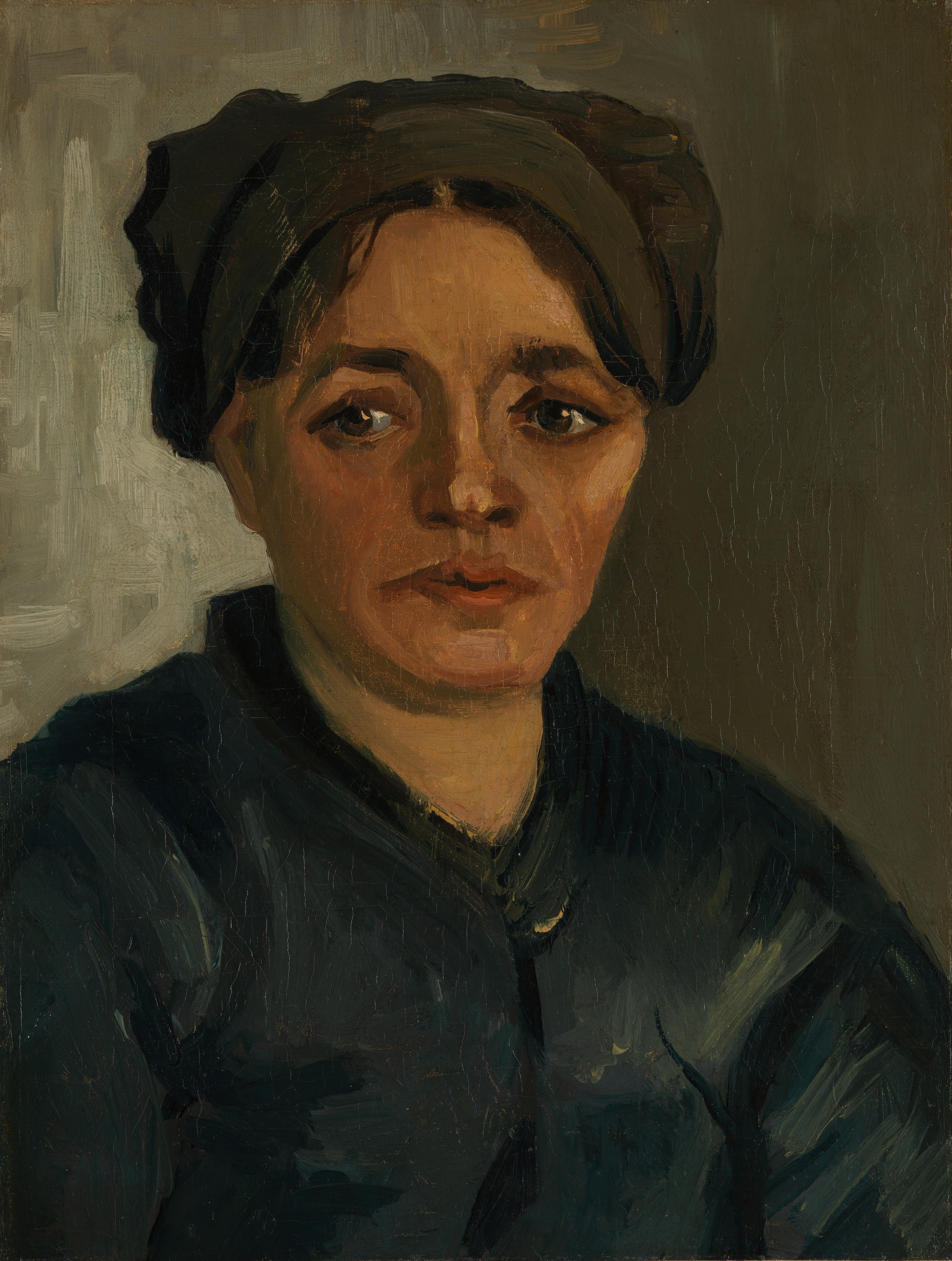
Head of a Peasant Woman with Dark Cap, 1885, Private collection (F137)

=== Portrait of a Woman in Blue ===
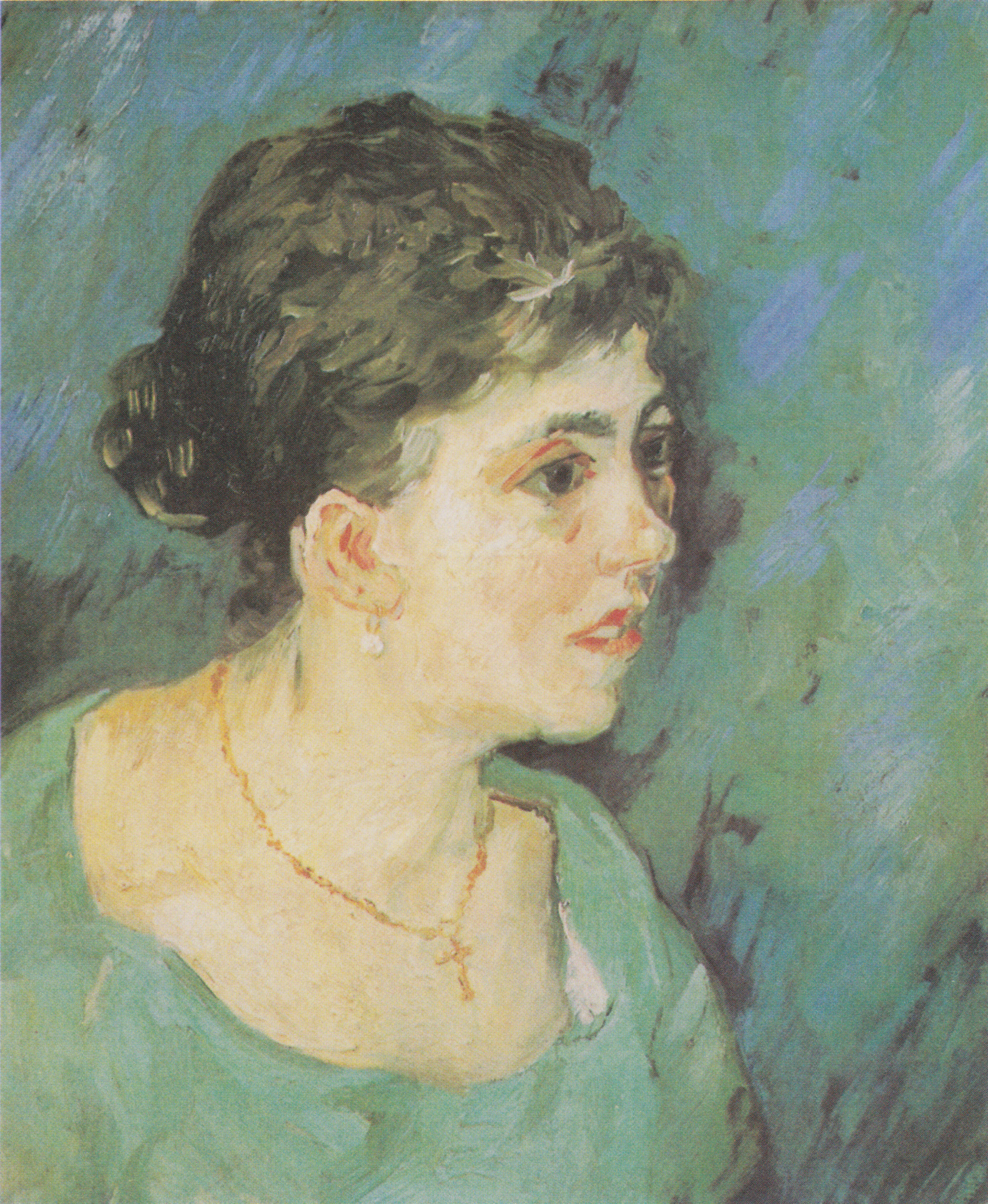
Portrait of Woman in Blue 1885 Van Gogh Museum, Amsterdam (F207a)

=== Portrait of a Woman with Red Ribbon ===
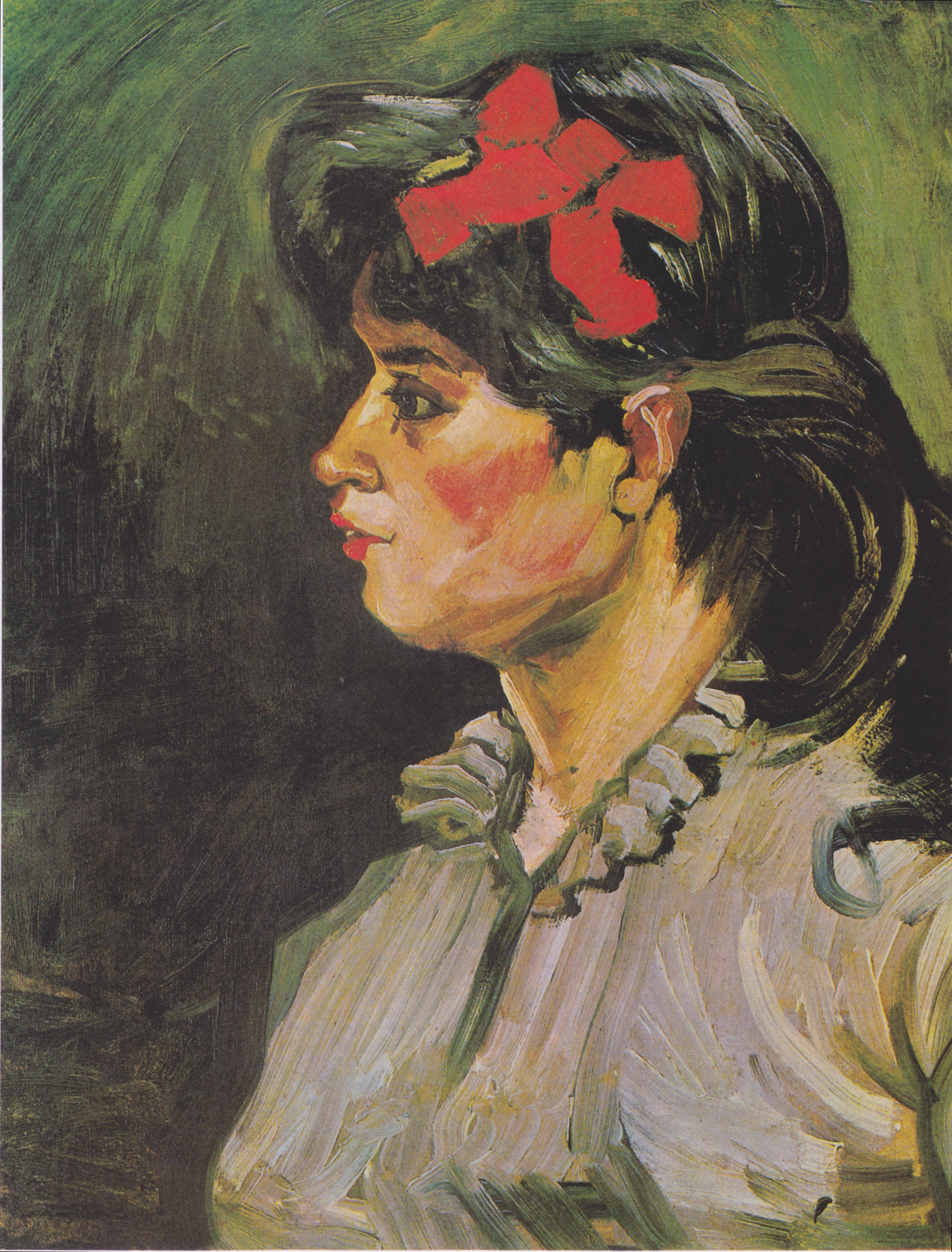
Portrait of a Woman with Red Ribbon 1885 Private collection (F207)

=== Portrait of an Old Man with Beard ===
Van Gogh described his sitter for this painting a "wonderful old man." It was made in Antwerp where Van Gogh hoped to bring in money to support himself by painting portraits.

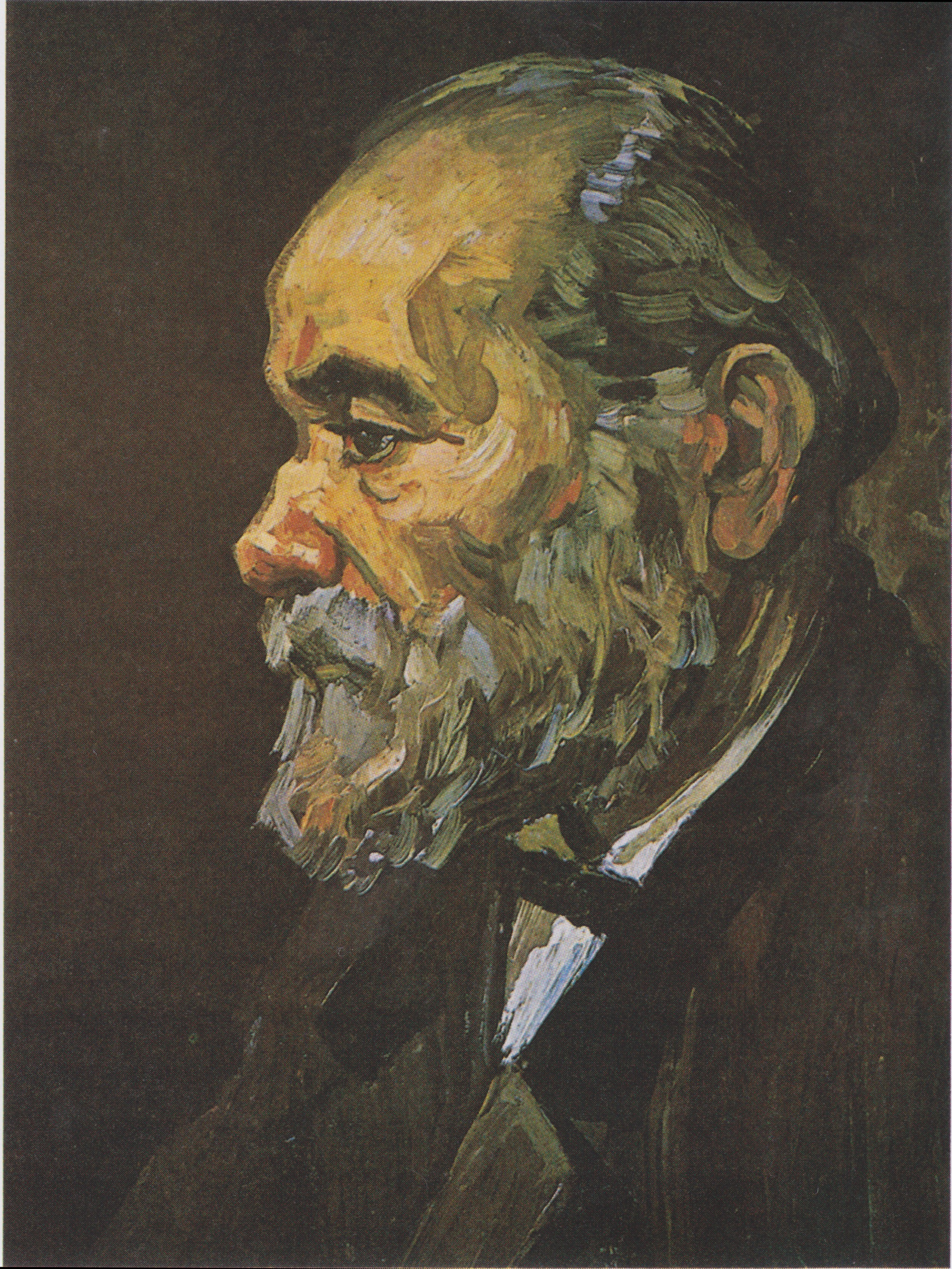
Portrait of an Old Man with Beard
1885
Van Gogh Museum, Amsterdam (F205)

=== Sien ===
Van Gogh made a series of paintings of Sien Hoornik, a prostitute whom he met and took in when he lived at The Hague. Included in the series are works of Sien's daughter, Maria, her newborn son and her mother.

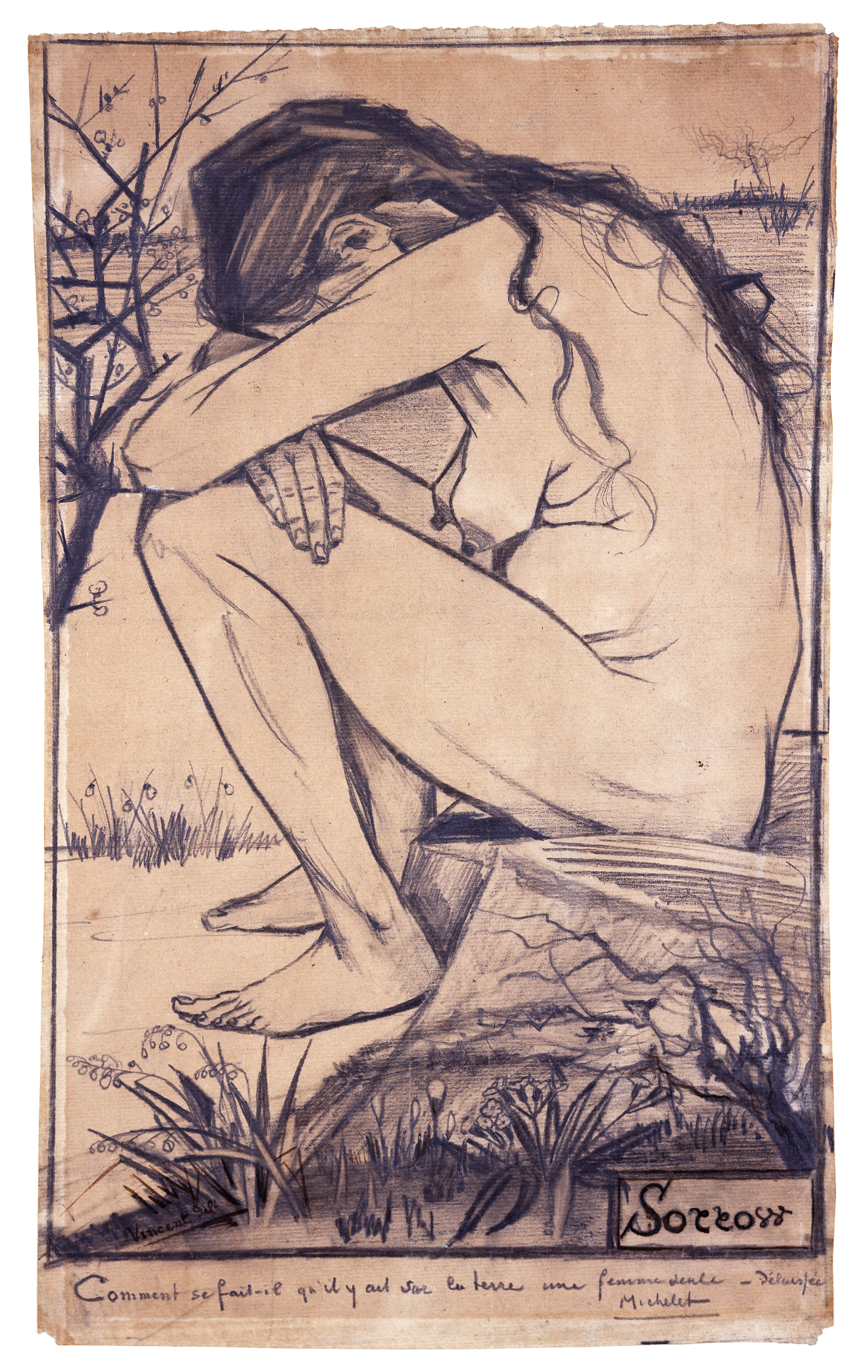

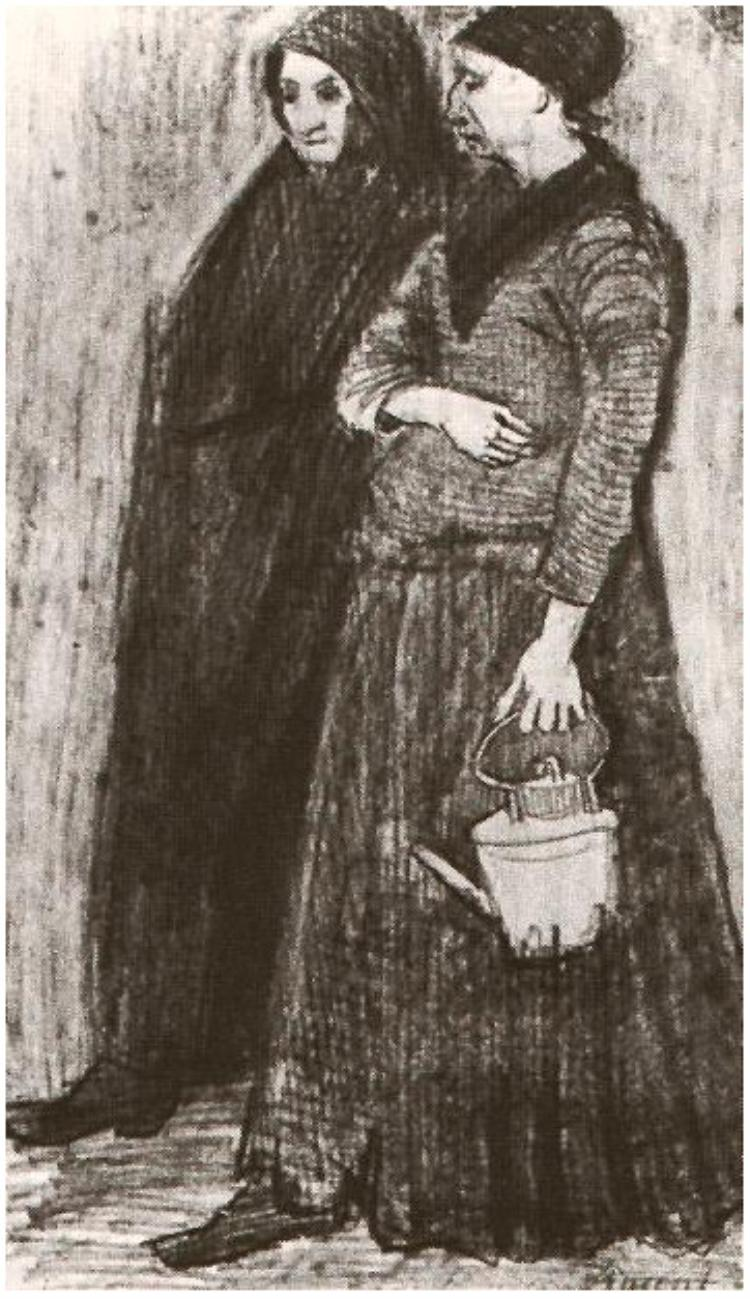

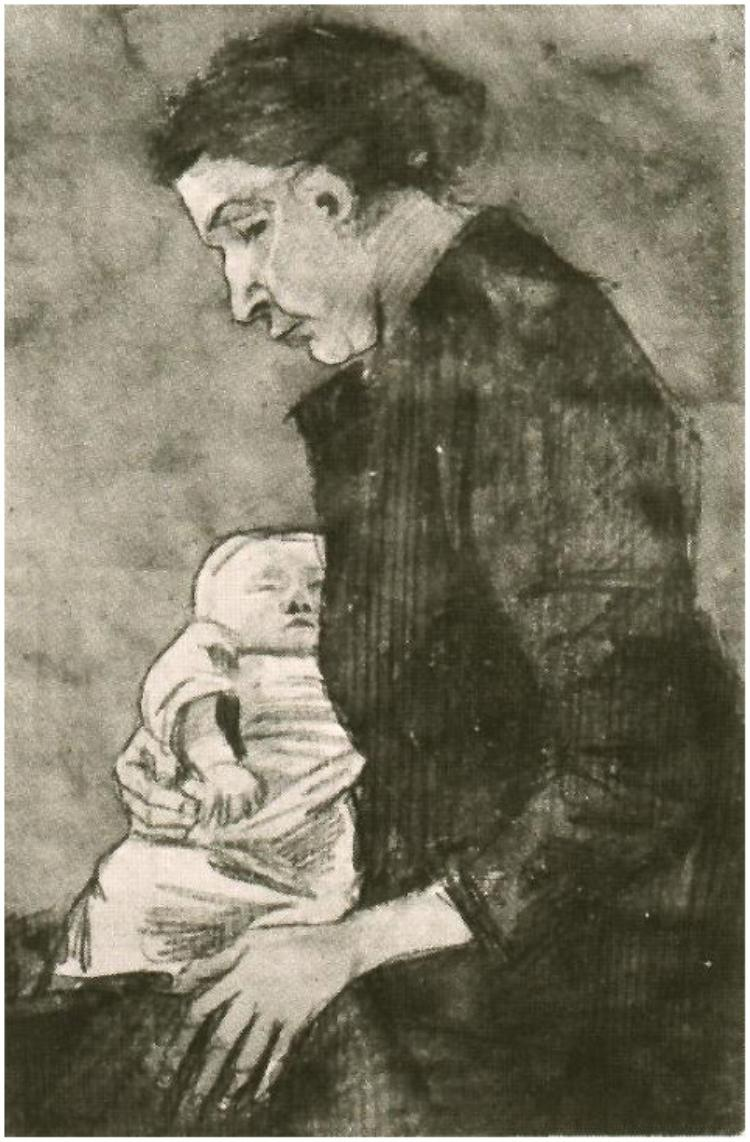

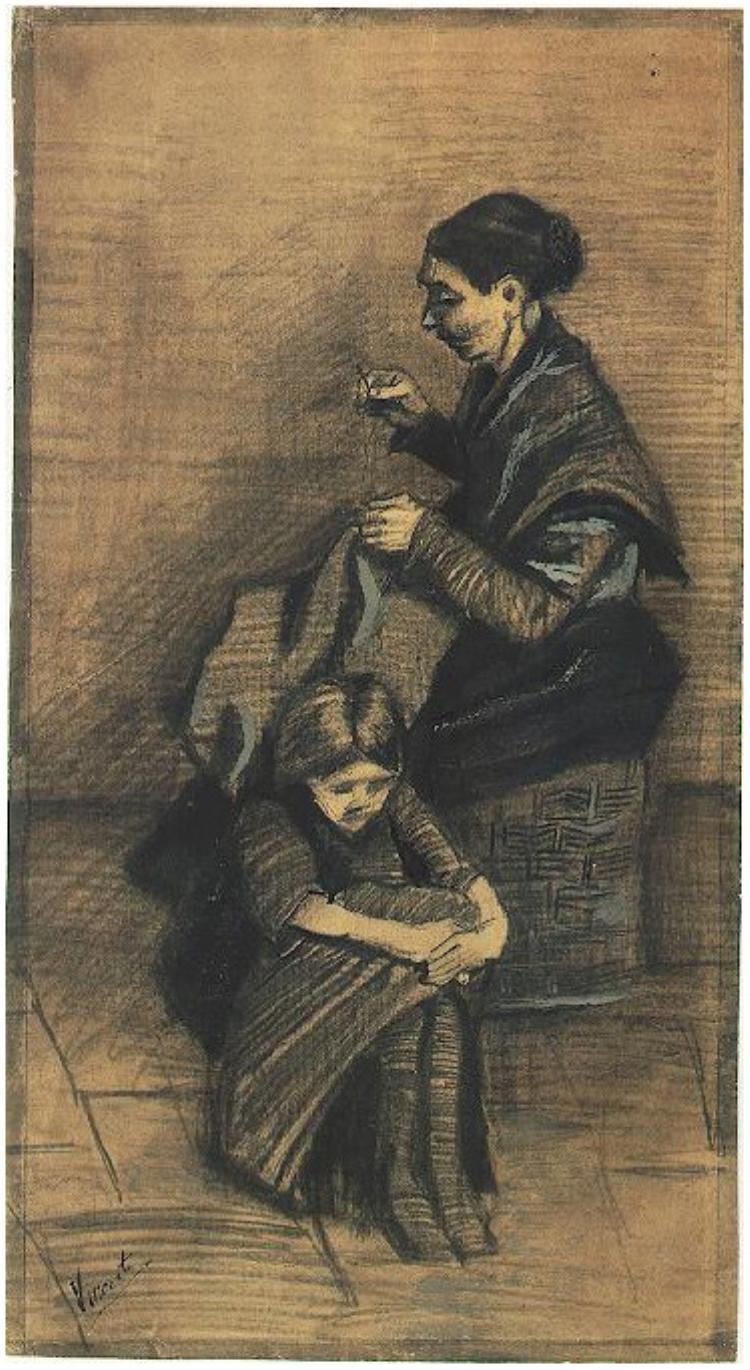

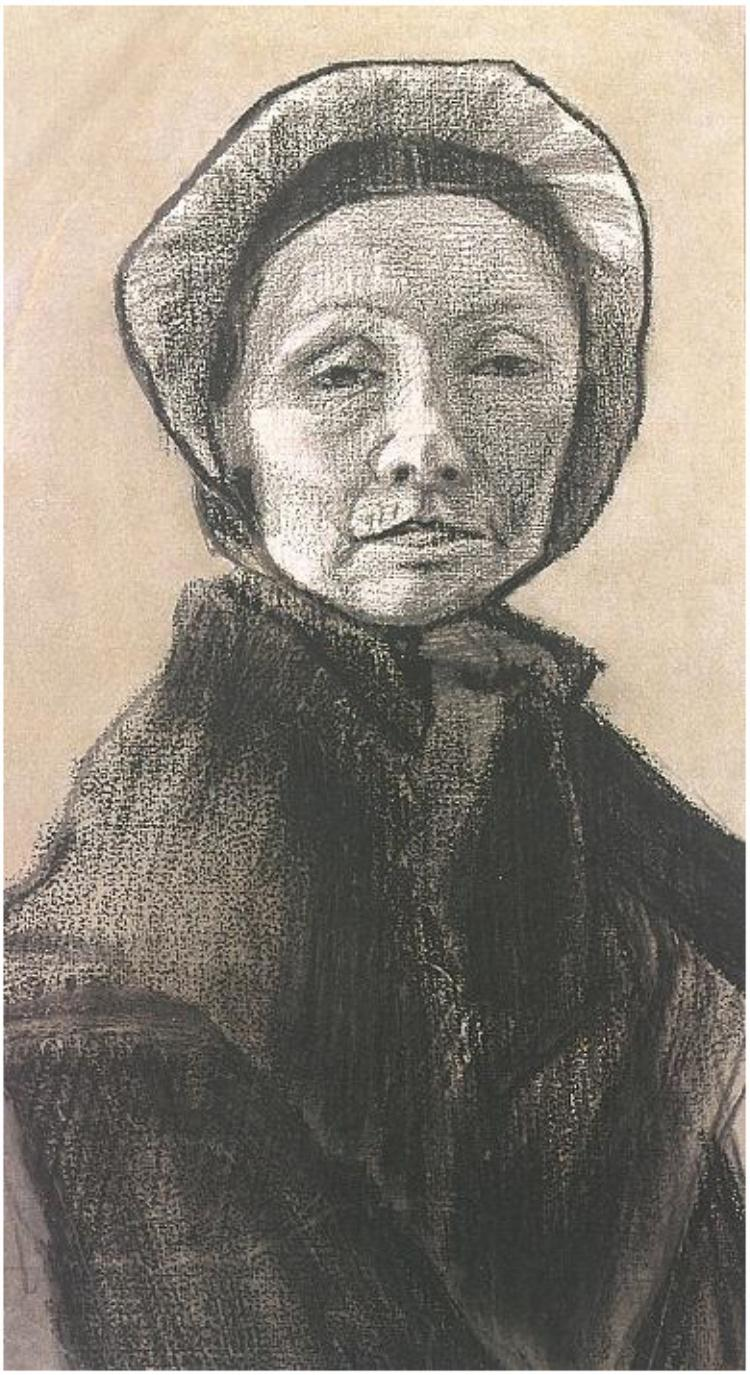

== Paris (1886–1888) ==
=== Alexander Reid ===
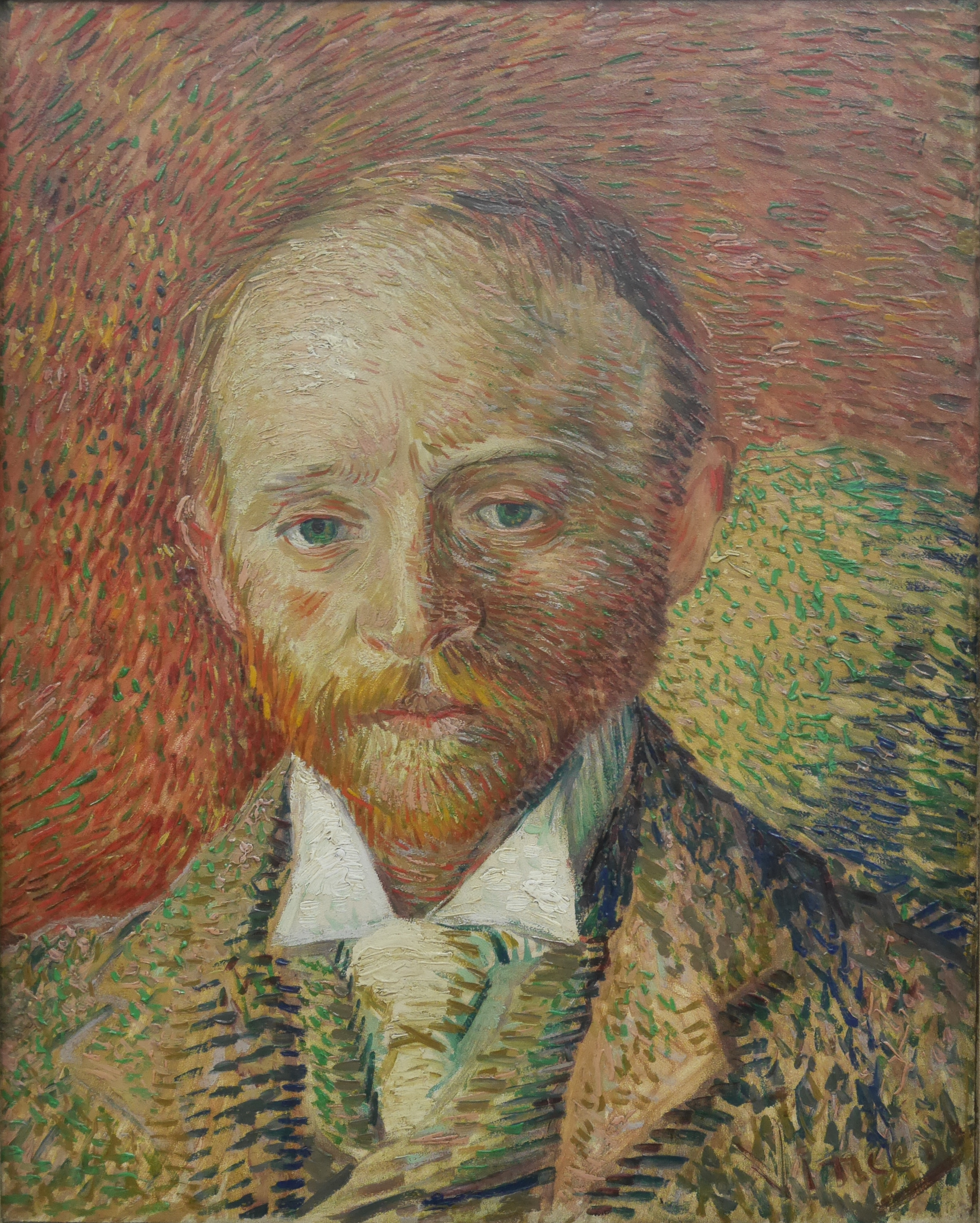
Portrait of the Art Dealer Alexander Reid
1887
Kelvingrove Art Gallery and Museum, Glasgow, Scotland (F343)

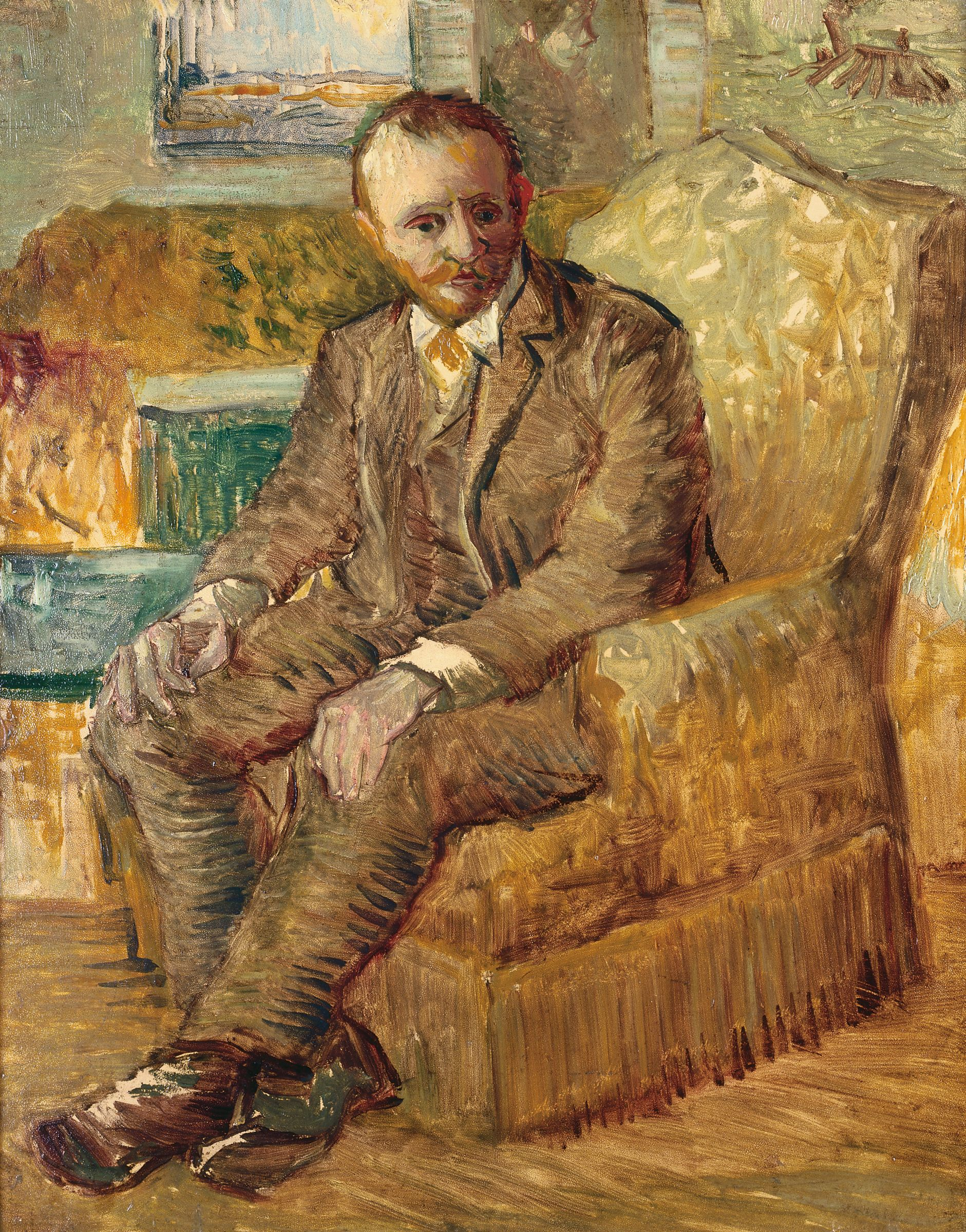
Portrait of the Art Dealer Alexander Reid; Sitting in an Easy Chair, 1886–87
Fred Jones Jr. Museum of Art, Norman, Oklahoma (F270)

=== Agostina Segatori ===
Van Gogh occasionally visited Café du Tambourin run by Agostina Segatori, the subject of this painting. Previously an artist's model to Manet and Corot and others, the Naples-born Agostina saved the money she earned working as a model and opened the Italian themed Café du Tambourin in 1885, which particularly catered to artists.

The Italian Woman also called La Italienne is "without doubt" Agostina Segatori, per the Musée d'Orsay. Van Gogh introduced elements of Japanese woodcut prints in this portrait. Van Gogh creates his own style of brushstroke from Impressionism and Pointillism, in this case a "criss-cross of overlapping nervous hatching. He uses red and green in her face which he later described as a technique "to be able to express the terrible passions of humanity by means of red and green".

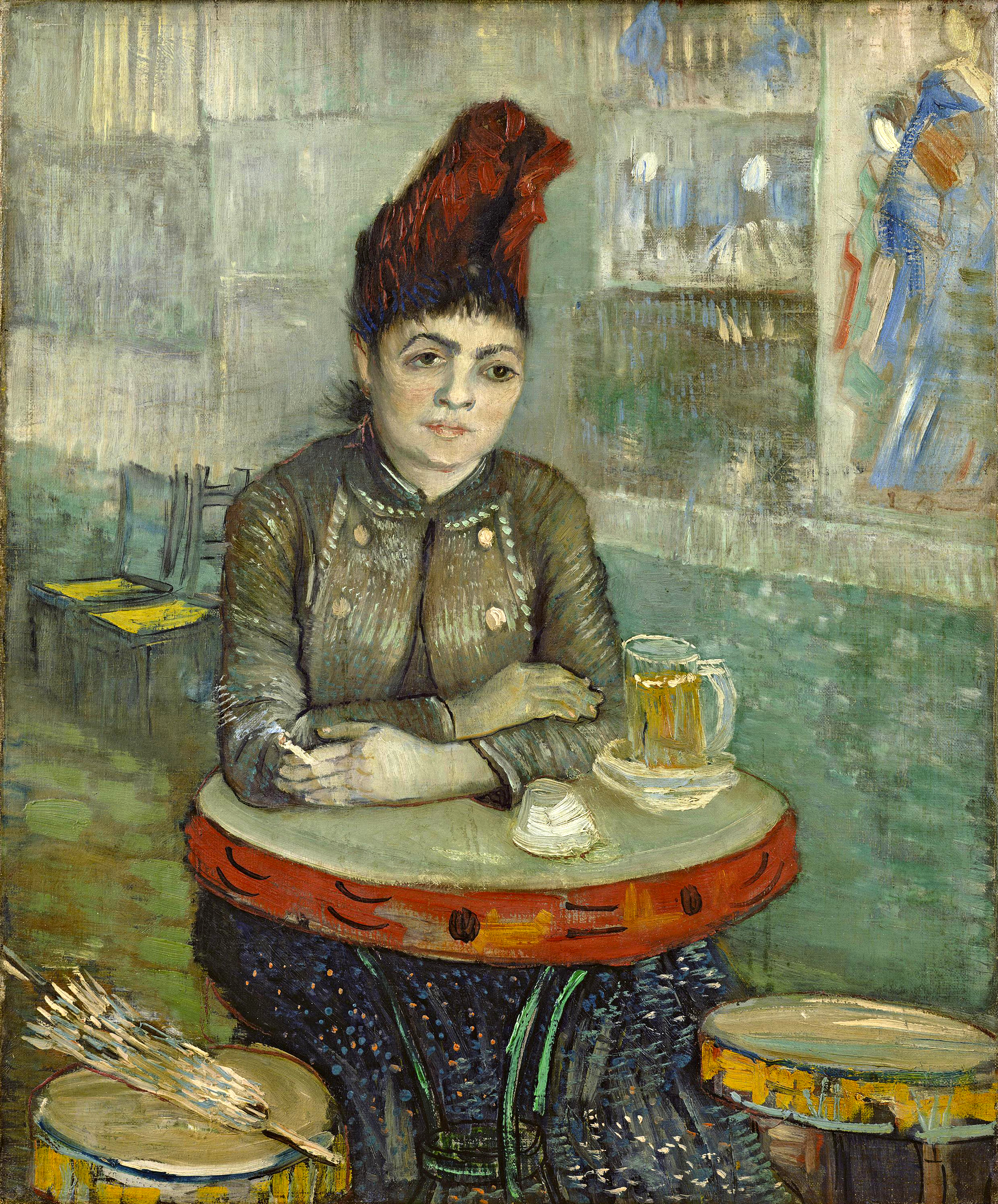
Agostina Segatori Sitting in the Café du Tambourin
1887
Van Gogh Museum, Amsterdam (F370)

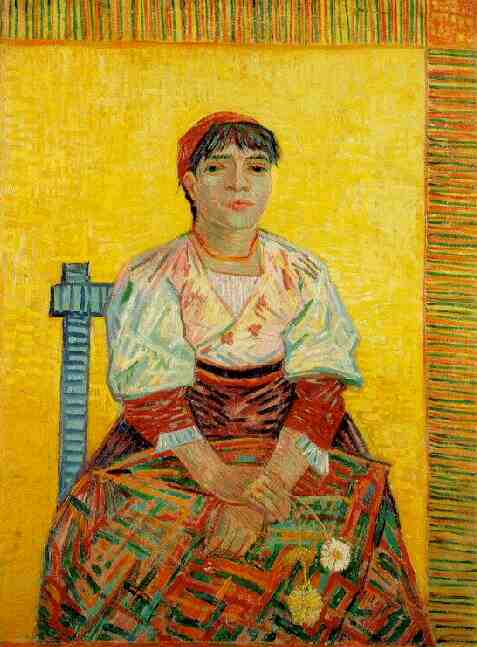
Italian Woman (Agostina Segatori)
1887
Musée d'Orsay, Paris (F381)

=== Etienne-Lucien Martin ===
The Portrait of Etienne-Lucien Martin was made of the owner of a restaurant in Paris. He allowed artists to exhibit their work. In November 1887 Van Gogh and his friends showed their works; Van Gogh did not sell a painting. Van Gogh made the painting of Martin with care and precision.

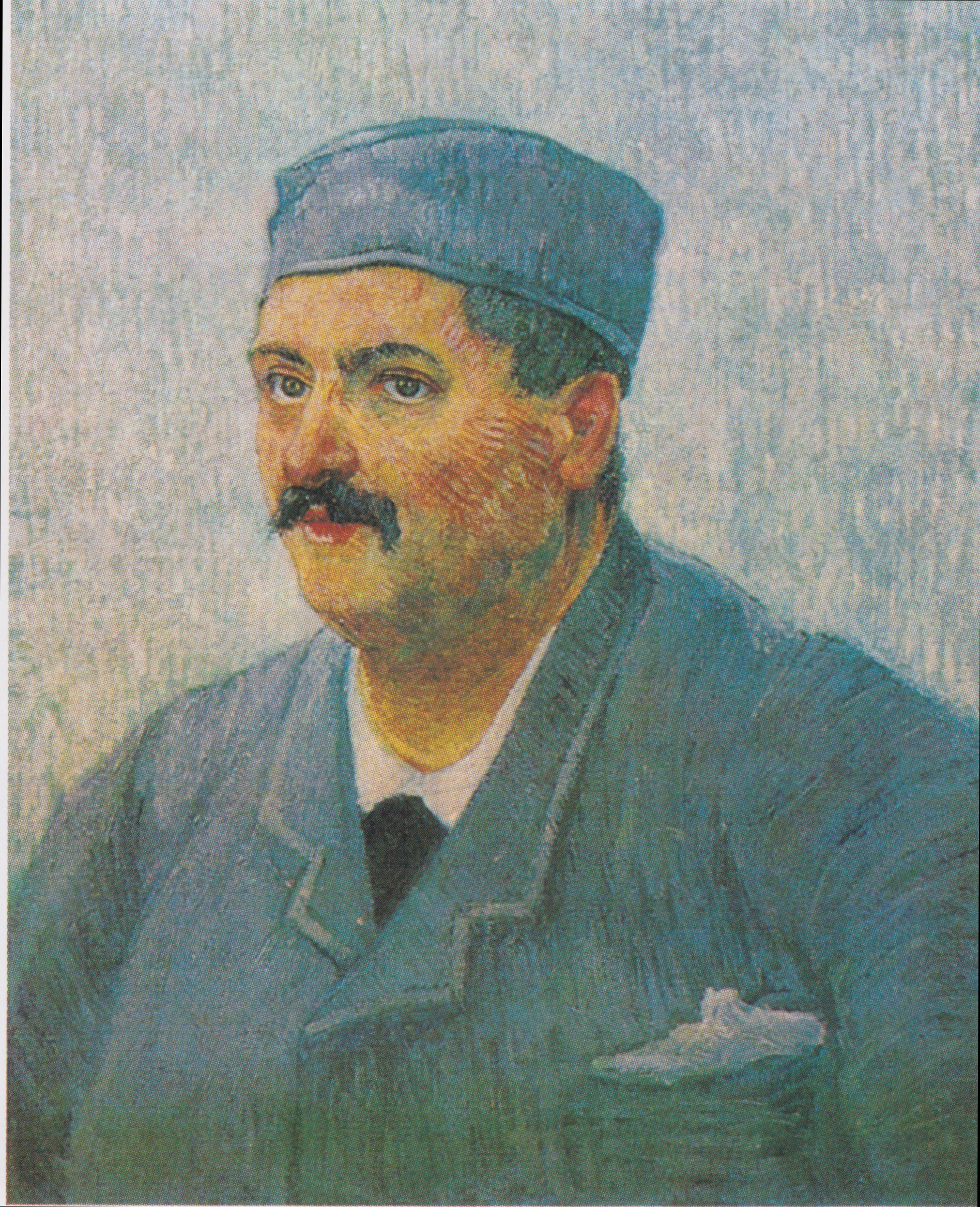
Portrait of Lucien Martin
1886–87
Van Gogh Museum, Amsterdam (F289)

=== Leonie Rose Davy-Charbuy ===
Art dealer Pierre Firmin-Martin, a friend of Van Gogh's brother Theo, displayed some of Van Gogh's paintings. Mother by a Cradle, Portrait of Leonie Rose Davy-Charbuy was made of Martin's niece who lived with her uncle. Reflective of the family's interest in art, paintings hang in the background. In the year the painting was made Theo commented that Van Gogh done a good job painting portraits but had never asked for payment.

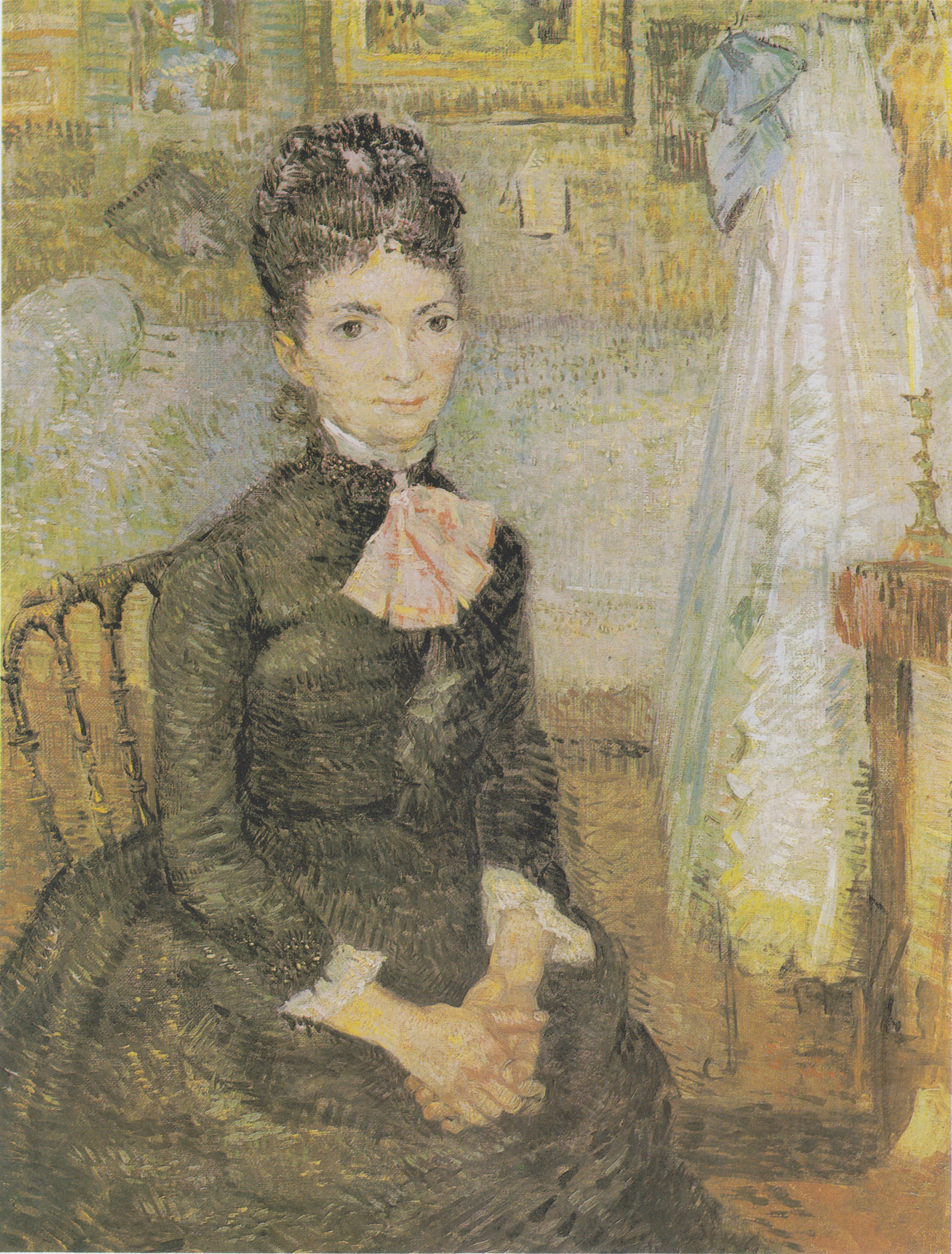
Mother by a Cradle, Portrait of Leonie Rose Davy-Charbuy
1887
Van Gogh Museum, Amsterdam (F369)

=== Nude study of a Little Girl ===
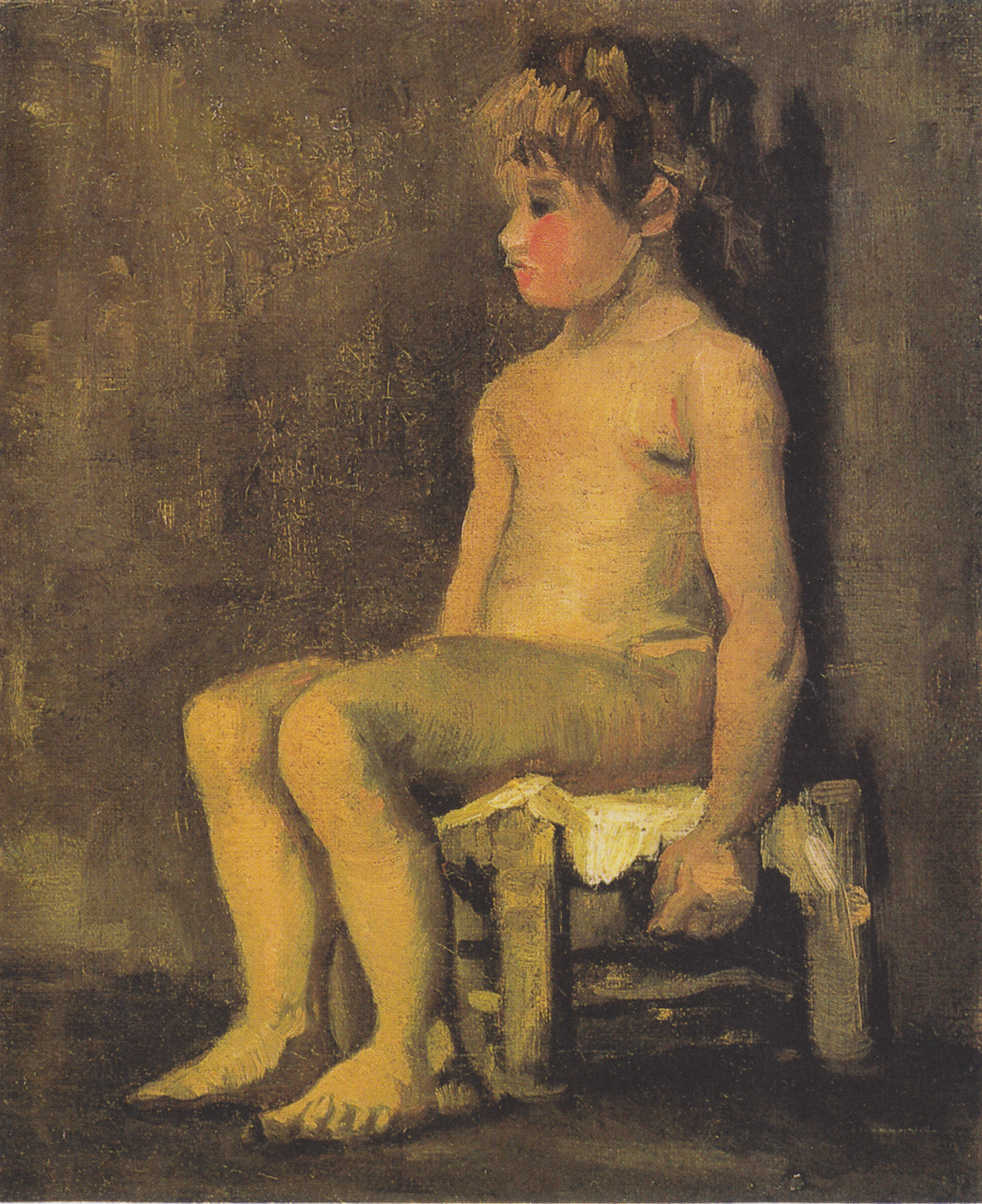
Nude Study of a Little Girl, Seated 1886 Van Gogh Museum, Amsterdam (F215)

=== Père Tanguy ===
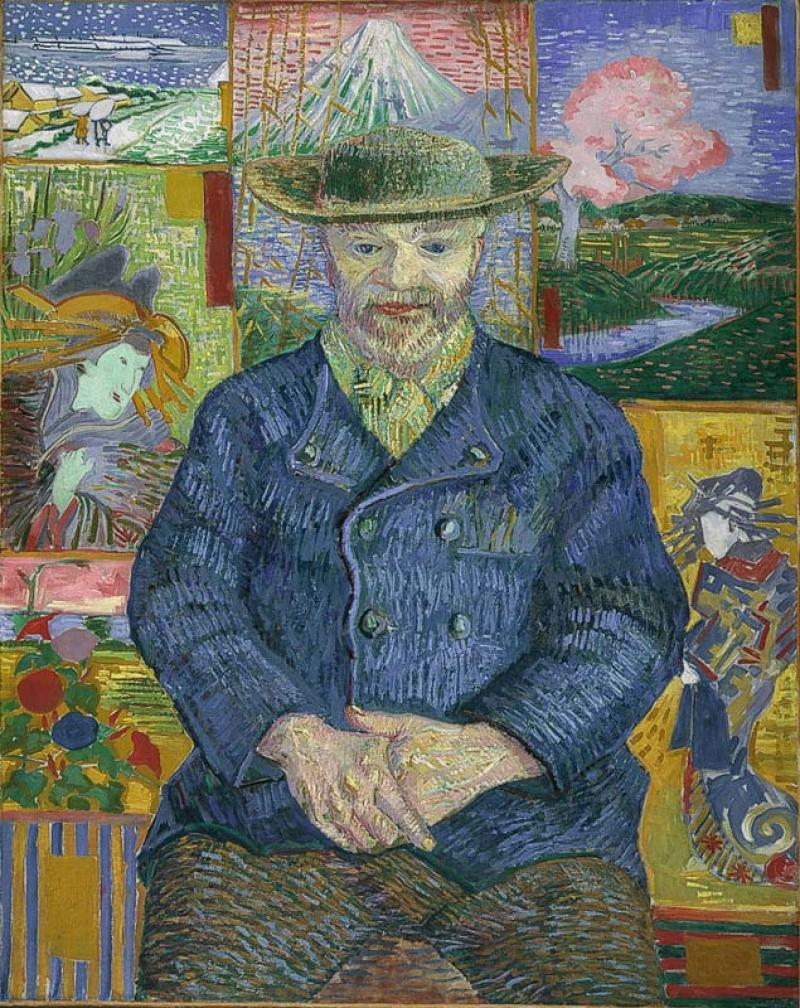
Portrait of Père Tanguy 1887-88 Musée Rodin, Paris (F363)

Portrait of Père Tanguy, painted by Vincent van Gogh in 1887, is one of three paintings of Julien Tanguy. The three works demonstrate a progression in Van Gogh's artistic style since arriving in Paris. The first painting is somber and the composition is simple. In the second painting Van Gogh introduces his Japanese prints. The last and most advanced in style, skill and color reflects integration of Japanese, Impressionist, and other influences of the Parisian artist community. The painting conveys a sense of serenity that Van Gogh seeks for himself. This last painting of Tanguy is in the Musée Rodin, Paris.

Père Tanguy was a Breton who was exiled and pardoned after taking part in the Paris Commune. When Vincent van Gogh knew him, he owned a small artist's supply shop. The shop was an important to the painters of the era. Impressionist painters in Paris were commonly found in Père Tanguy's shop. Painters like Cézanne, Pissarro, and Gauguin, as well as their paintings, frequented the shop. Van Gogh painted a few portraits of Père Tanguy. This specific portrait was painted in the winter of 1887-88.

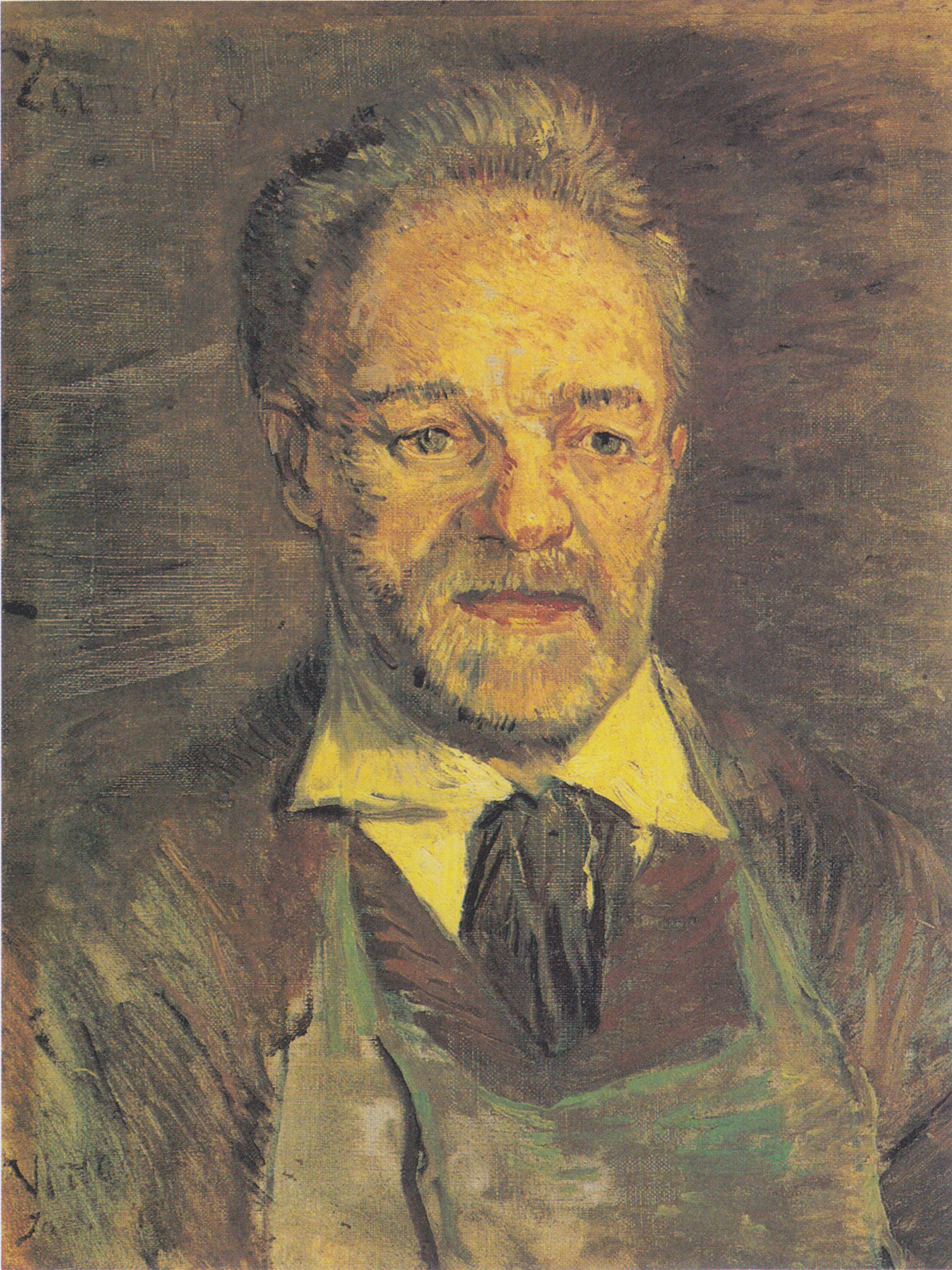
Portrait of Père Tanguy
1886–87
Ny Carlsberg Glyptotek, Copenhagen (F263)

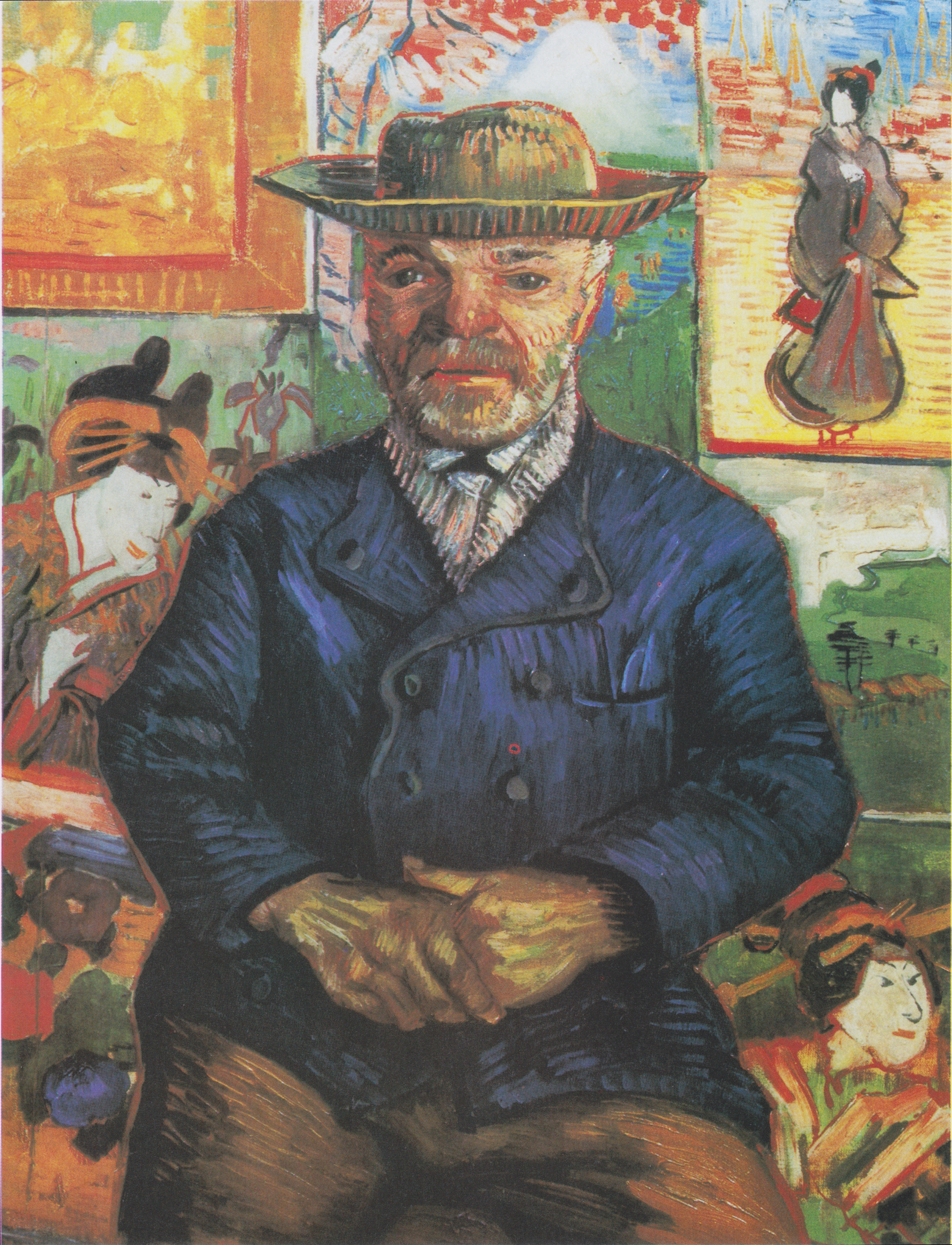
Portrait of Père Tanguy, The second painting of Père Tanguy
1887-88
Private collection of Philip Niarchos or Tate Gallery, London (F364)

=== Portrait of a Man ===
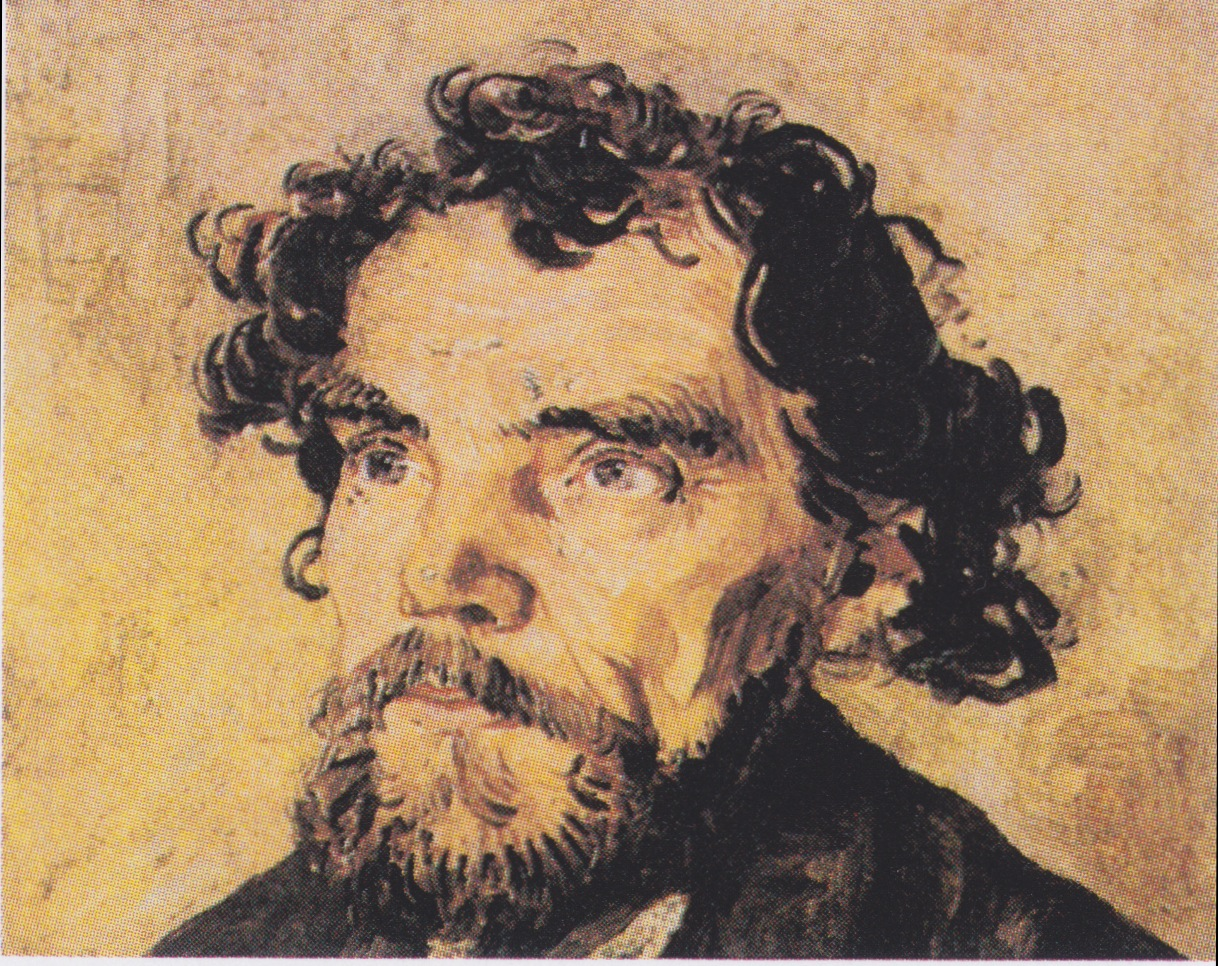
Portrait of a Man 1886 National Gallery of Victoria, Melbourne, Victoria (F209)

=== Portrait of a Man with a Moustache ===
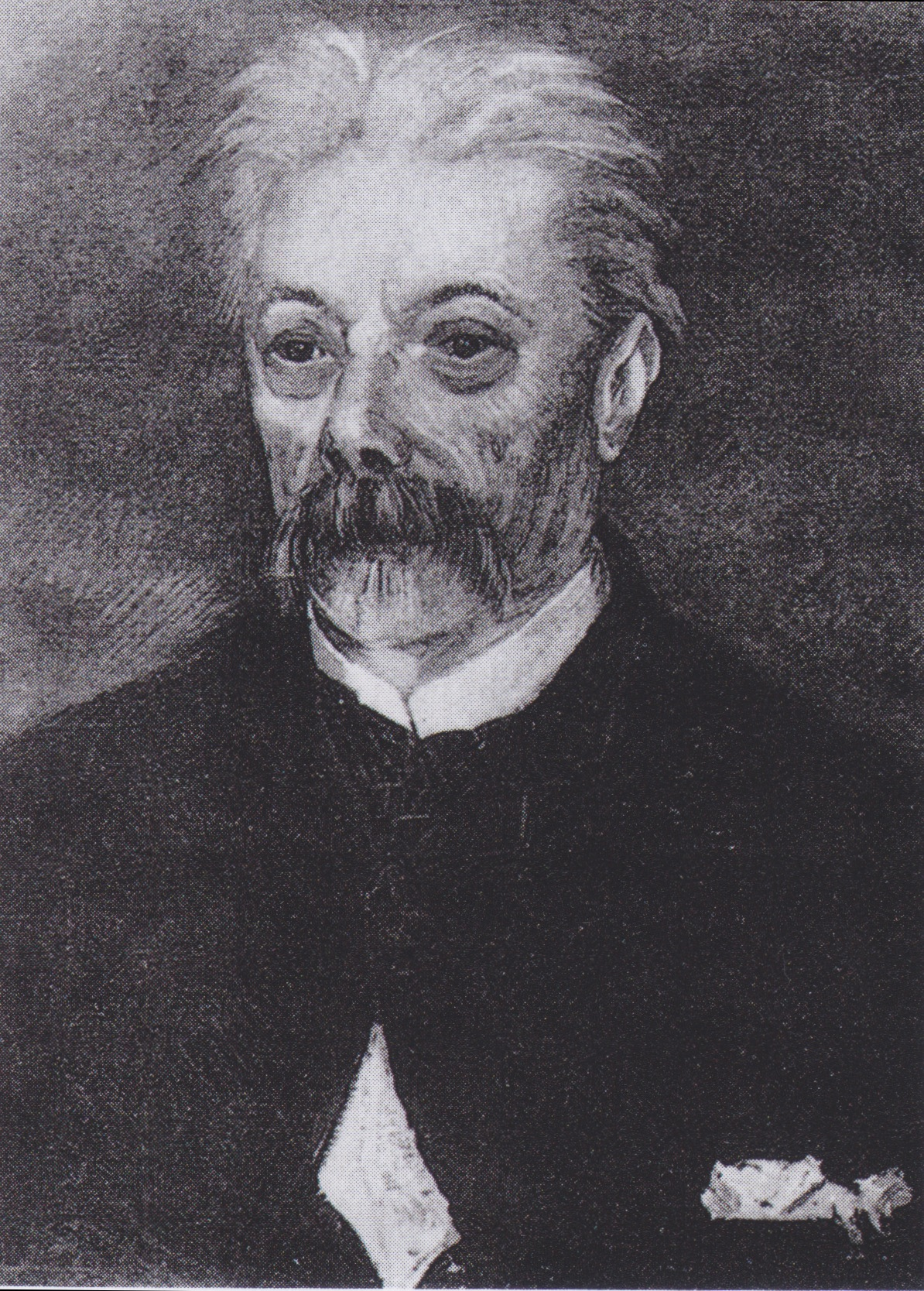
Portrait of a Man with a Moustache 1886–87 Location unknown (F288)

=== Portrait of a Woman ===
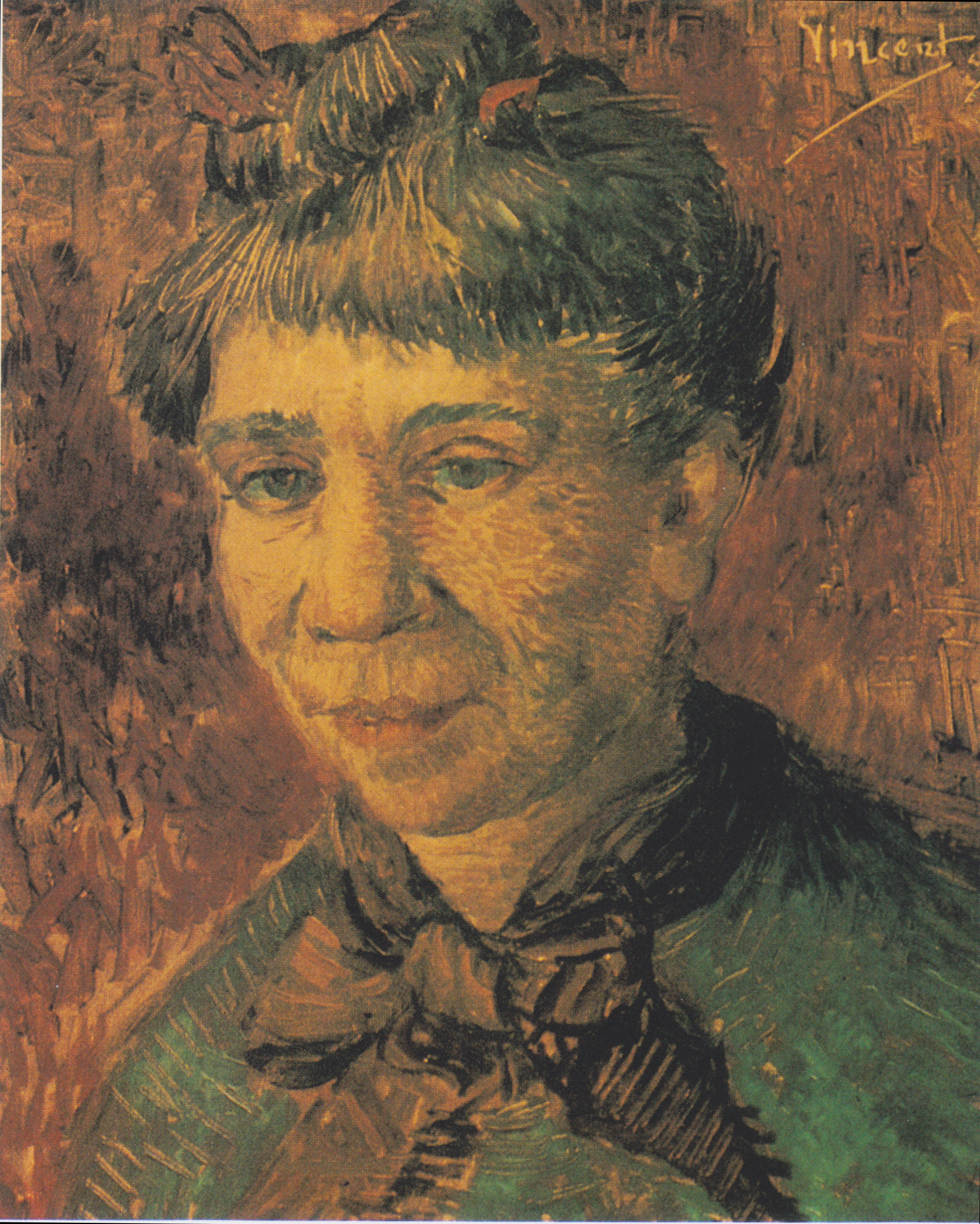
Portrait of a Woman (Madame Tanguy?) 1886–87 Kunstmuseum, Basel (F357)

=== Portrait of a Woman, Facing Right ===
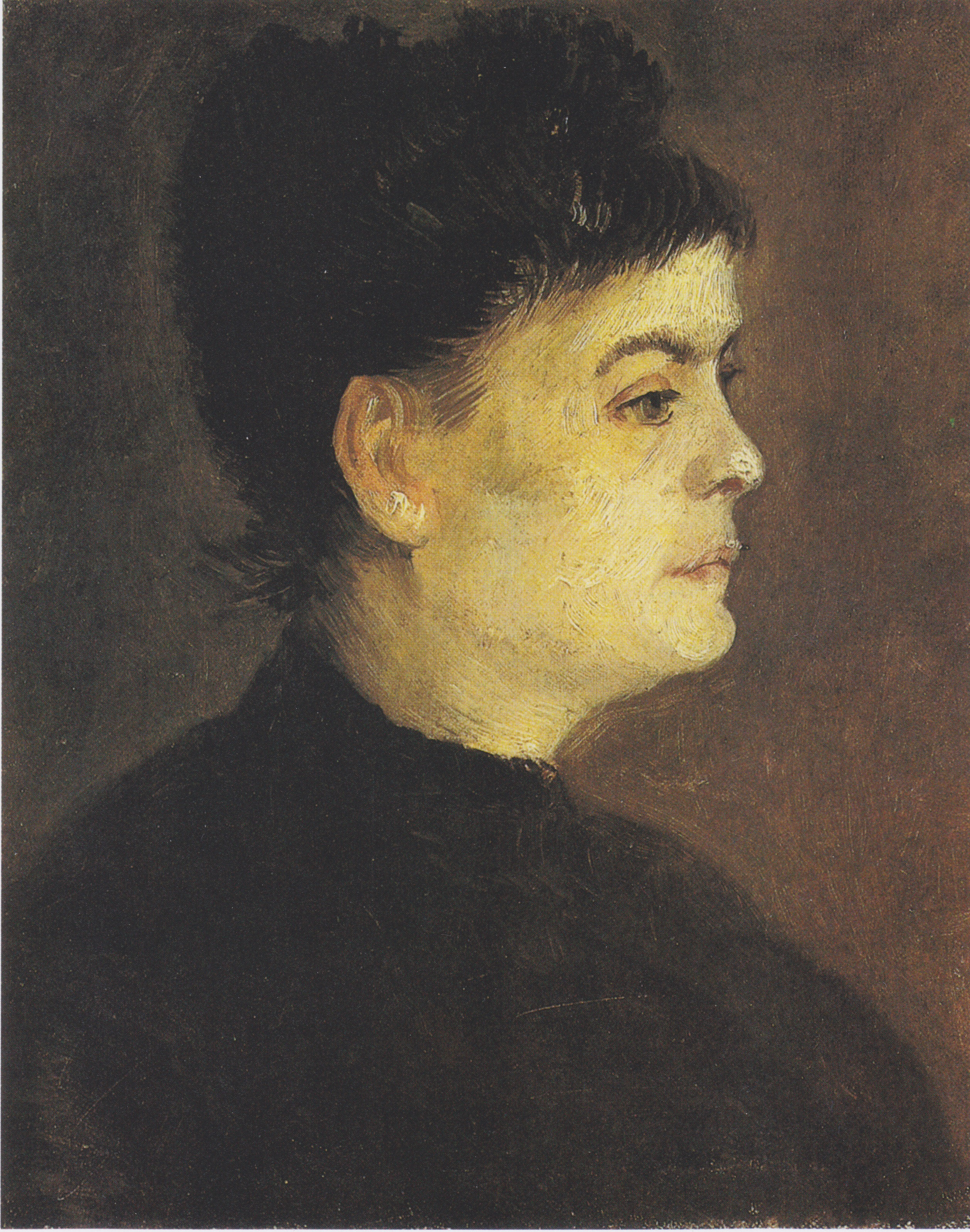
Portrait of a Woman, Facing Right 1886 Van Gogh Museum, Amsterdam (F215b)

=== The Smoker ===
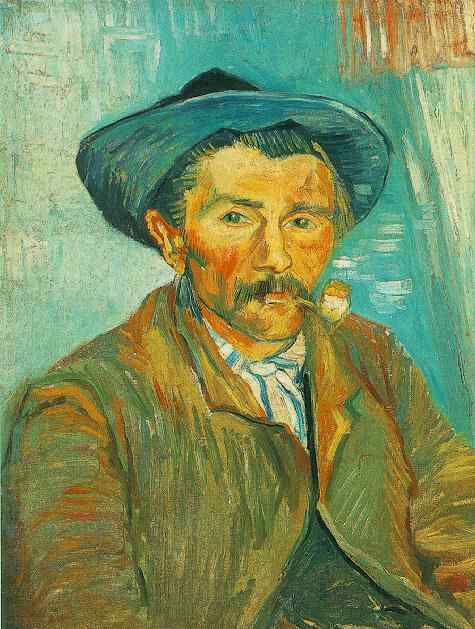
The Smoker, 1887
Oil on canvas, 60 x 49 cm
Barnes Foundation, Philadelphia

=== Woman Sitting in the Grass ===
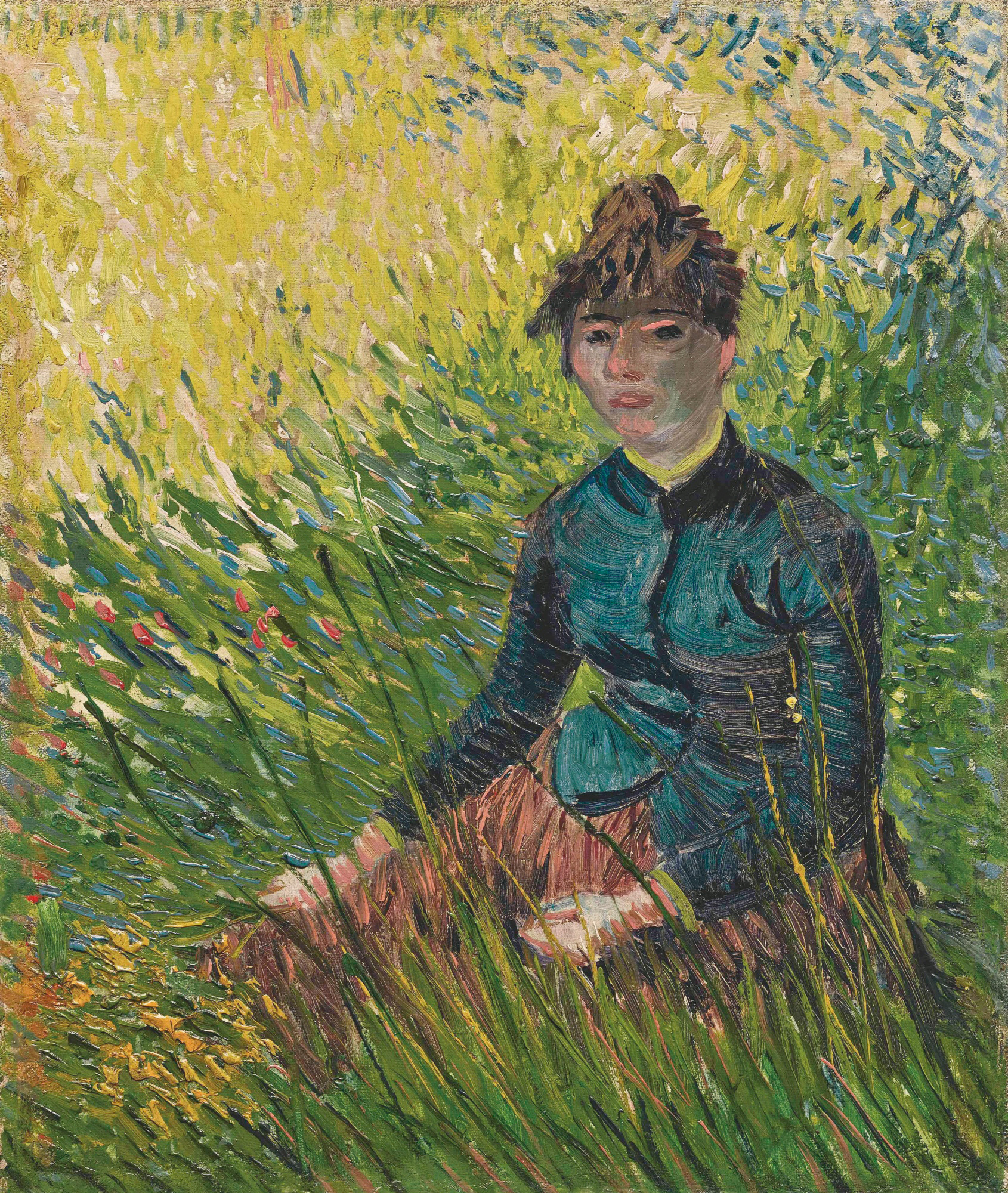
Woman Sitting in the Grass 1887 Private collection (F367)

== Arles (1888–1889) ==
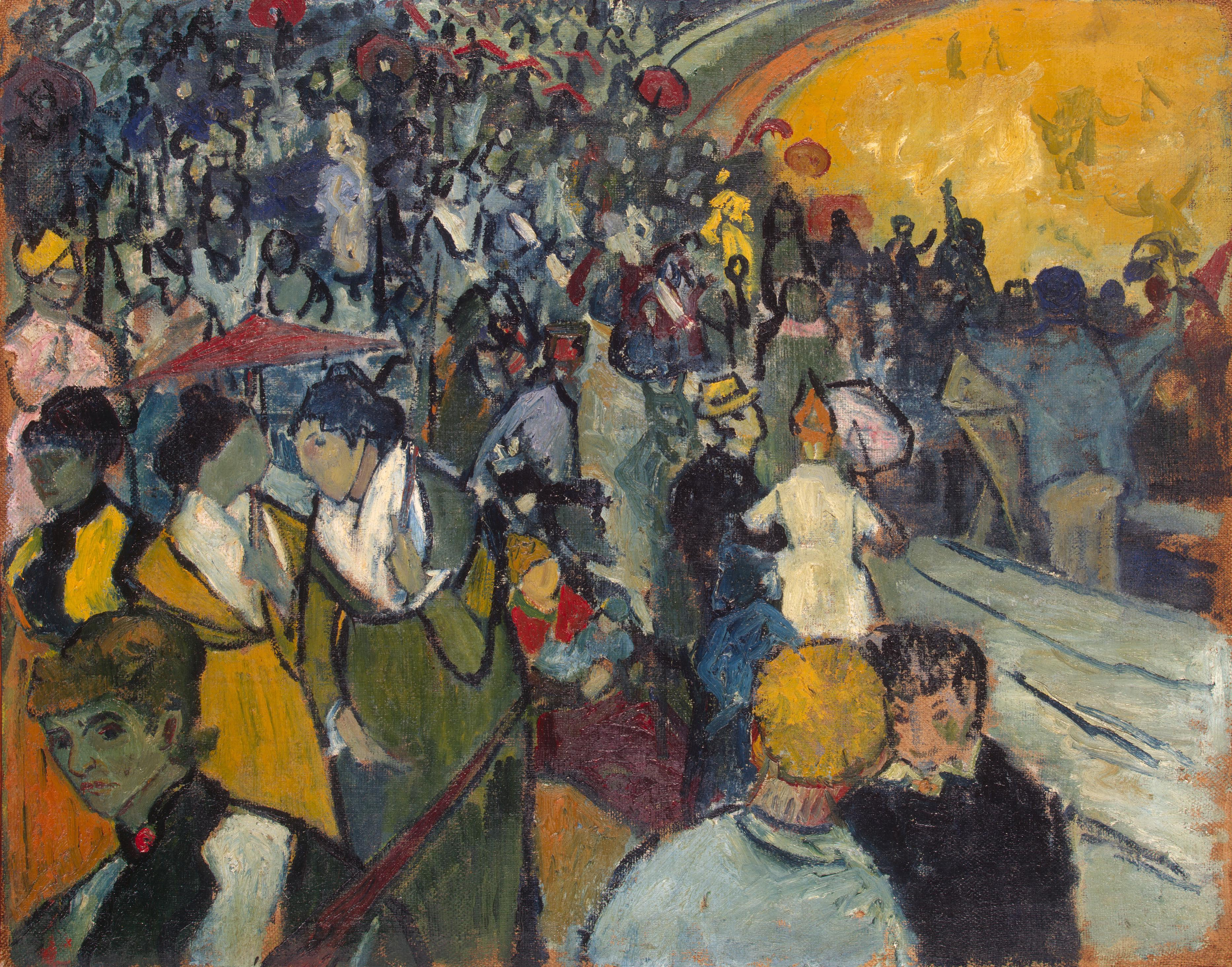
Les Arènes (December 1888) Hermitage Museum, St. Petersburg. Members of the Roulin Family are depicted in this portrait, and the woman in Arlésienne costume has the profile of Madame Ginoux.

Van Gogh wrote to his sister while in Arles, "what I really hope to do is paint a good portrait."

=== Doctor Rey ===
According to Doiteau and Leroy, one day Van Gogh wanted to present a painting he had just finished to Dr. Rey. But the doctor refused the gift, so Van Gogh offered the painting to the pharmacist of the hospital just passing by, a Mr Rousseau. He, too, refused and so the next passer-by, the administrator of the hospital, was offered the painting – and he, a certain Mr Neuvière, is said to have accepted.

Rey later reminisced: "When I saw that he outlined my head entirely in green (he had only two main colors, red and green), that he painted my hair and my mustache--I really did not have red hair--in a blazing red on a biting green background, I was simply horrified ..."

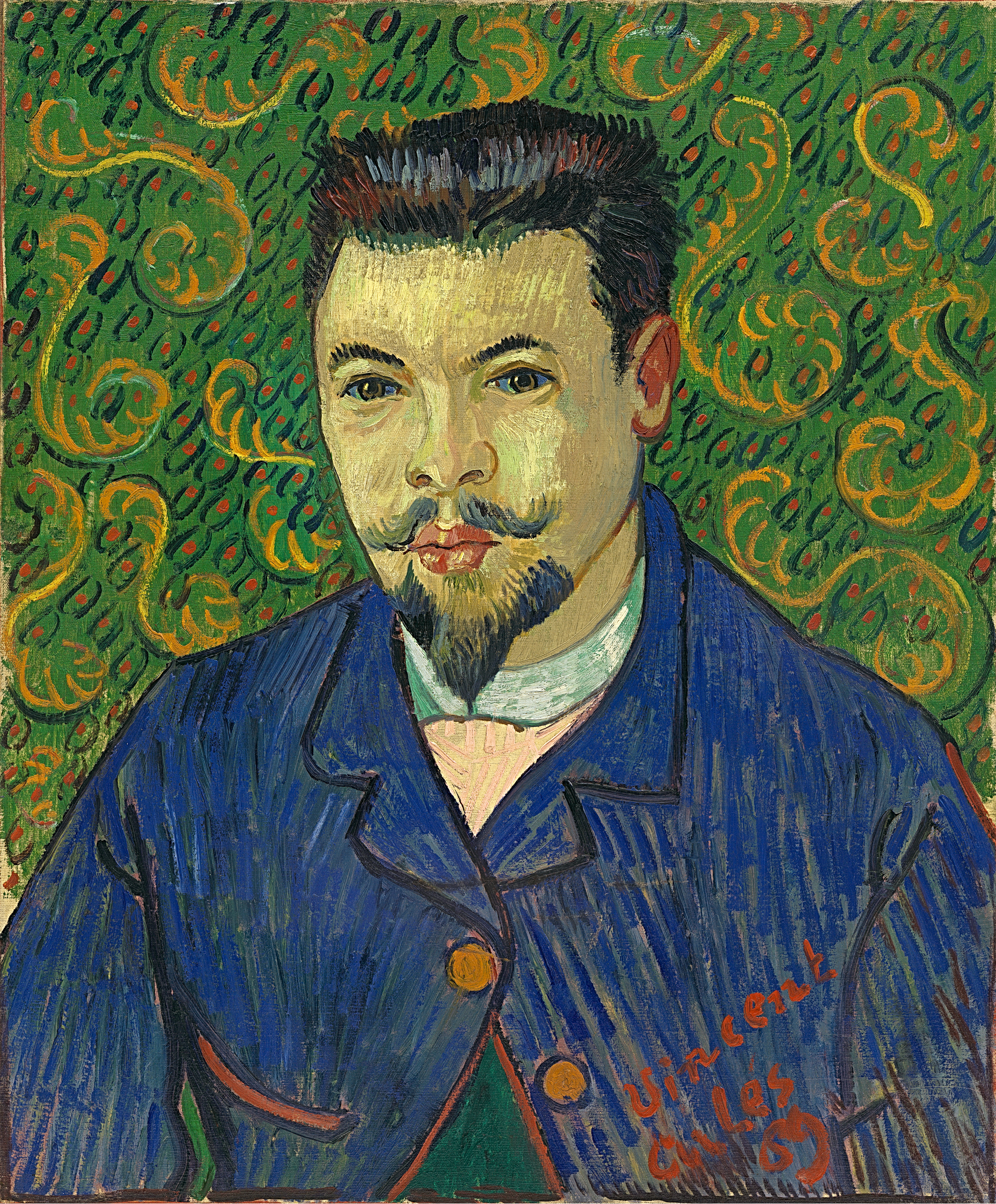
Portrait of Doctor Félix Rey
January 1889
Pushkin Museum, Moscow, Russia (F500)

=== The Ginoux Family ===
Marie Ginoux, born Jullian (or Julien) in Arles (June 8, 1848 - August 2, 1911), and her husband Joseph (1835–1906) married February 2, 1866, and ran the Café de la Gare, at 30 Place Lamartine.

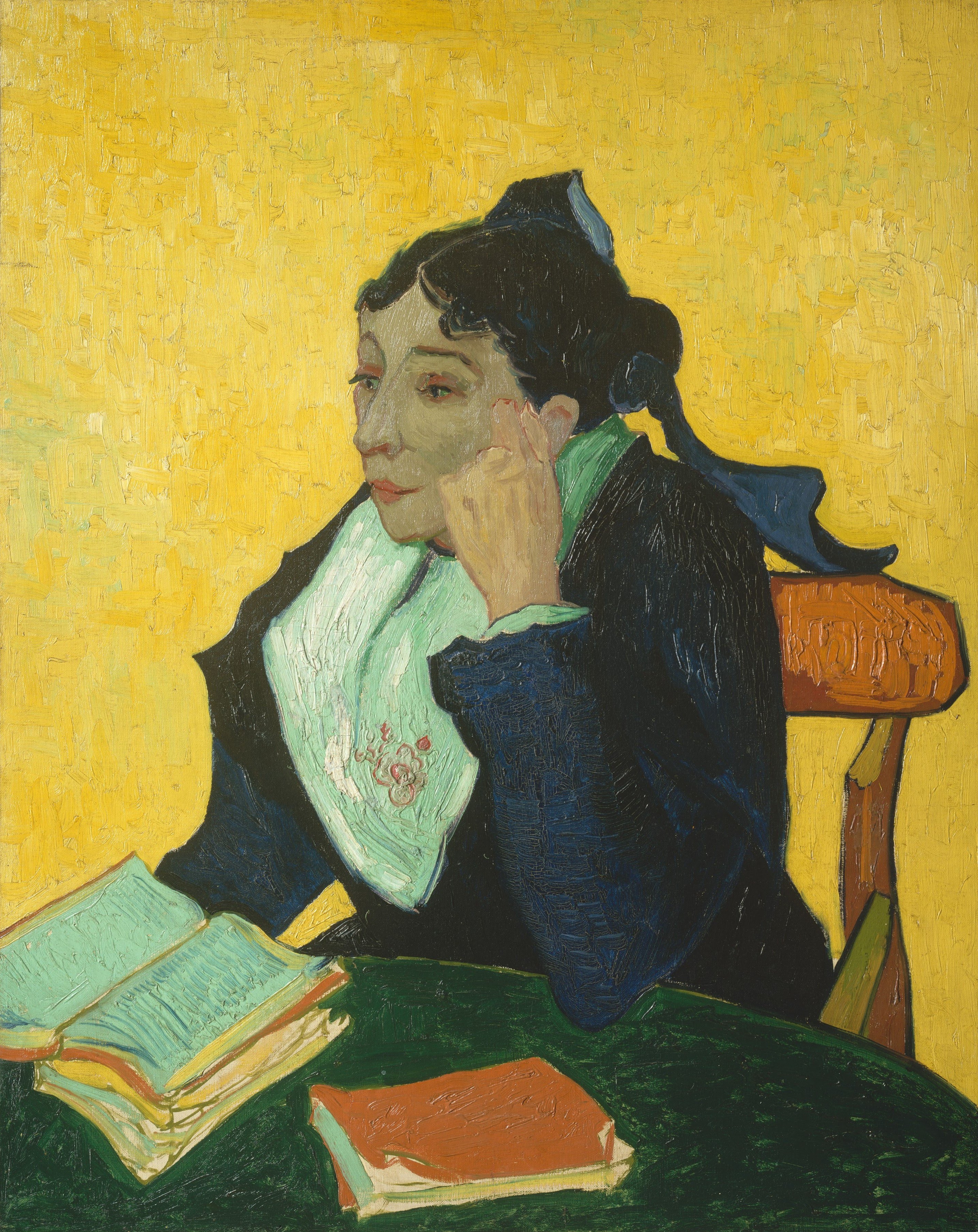
L'Arlesienne: Madame Ginoux with Books
1888
The Metropolitan Museum of Art, New York (F488)

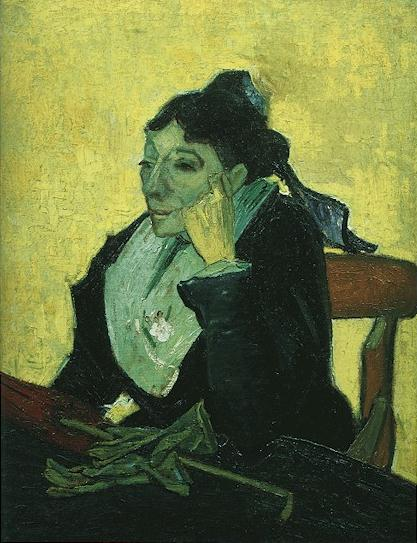
L'Arlesienne: Portrait of Madame Ginoux
1888
Musée d'Orsay, Paris (F489)

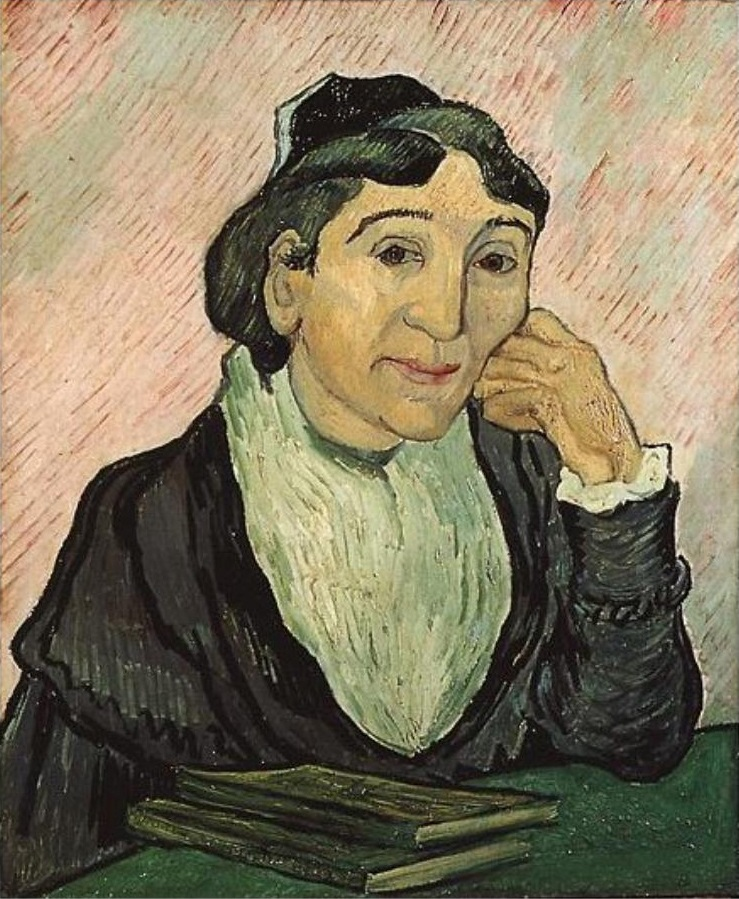
L'Arlesienne (Portrait of Madame Ginoux)
1890
Museum of Modern Art, Rome (F540)

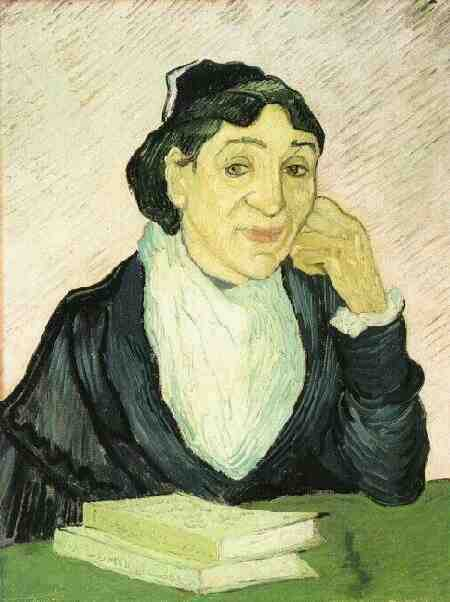
L'Arlesienne (Portrait of Madame Ginoux)
1890
Kröller-Müller Museum, Otterlo, Netherlands (F541)

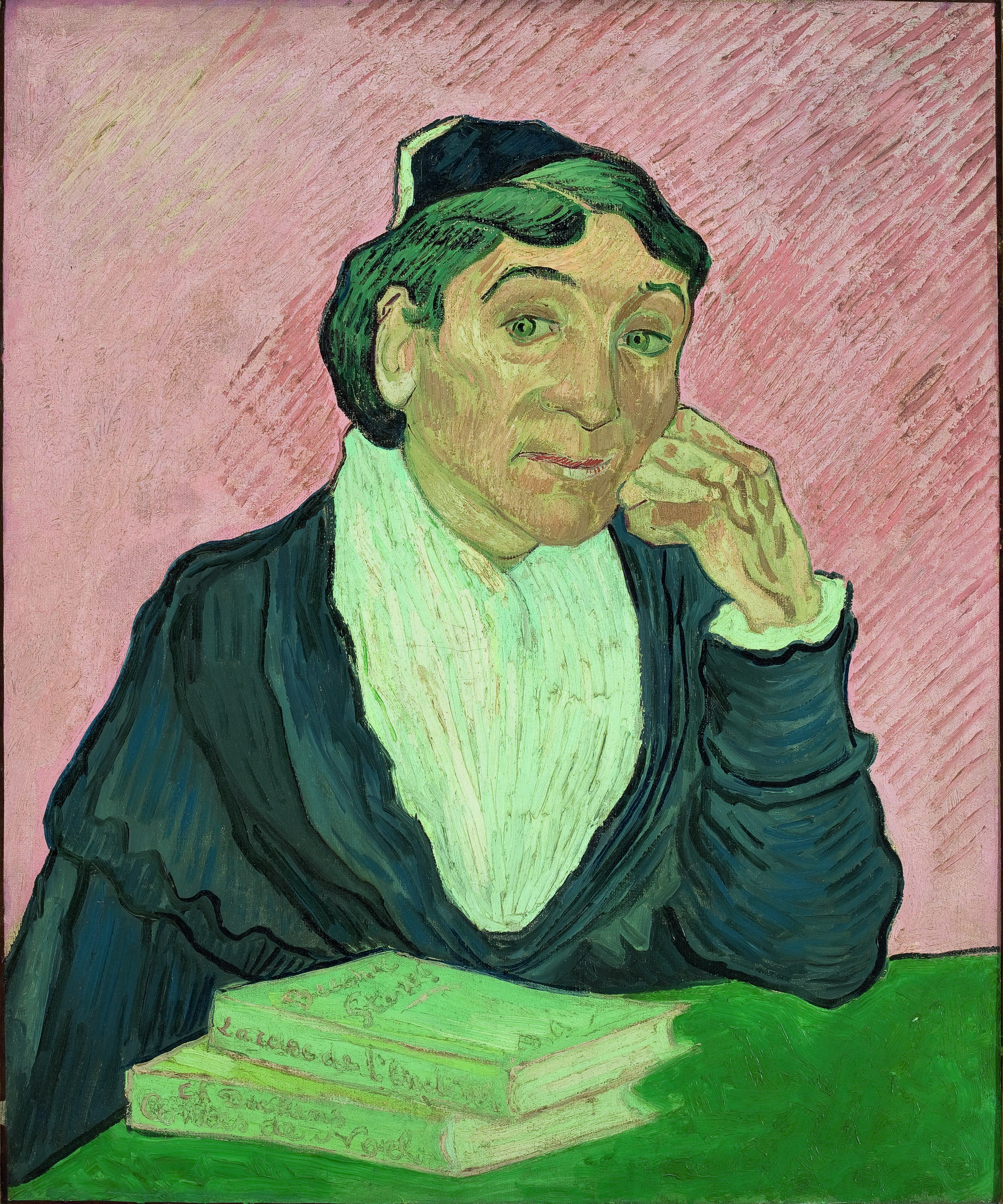
L'Arlesienne (Portrait of Madame Ginoux)
1890
São Paulo Museum of Modern Art, São Paulo (F542)

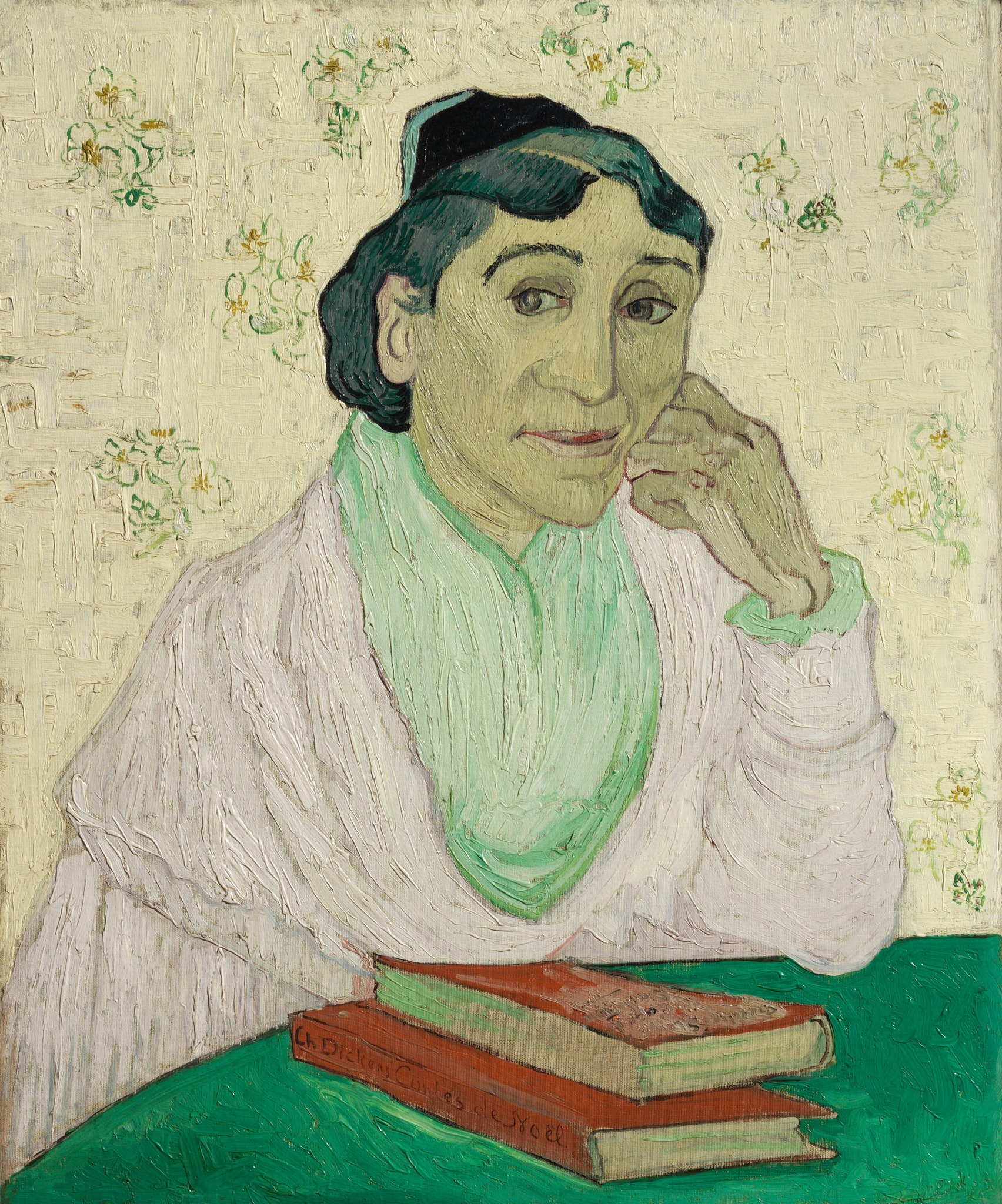
L'Arlesienne (Portrait of Madame Ginoux)
1890
Private Collection (F543)

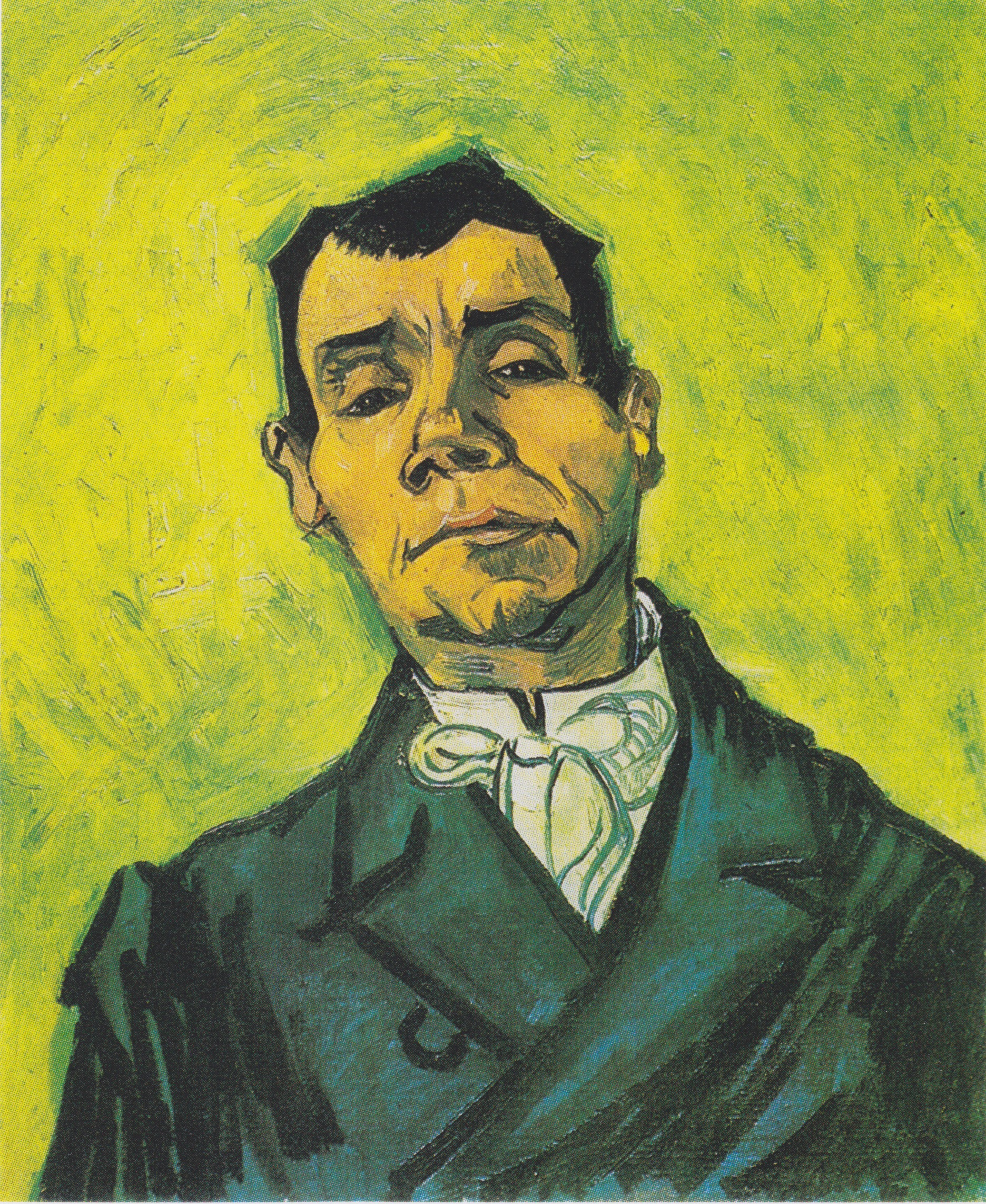
Portrait of Joseph-Michel Ginoux
1888
Kröller-Müller Museum, Otterlo, Netherlands (F533)

=== La Mousmé ===
La Mousmé was painted by Vincent van Gogh in 1888 while living in Arles, which Van Gogh dubbed "the Japan of the south". Retreating from the city, he hoped that his time in Arles would evoke in his work the simple, yet dramatic expression of Japanese art. Inspired by Pierre Loti's novel Madame Chrysanthème and Japanese artwork, Vincent painted La Mousmé, a well-dressed Japanese girl.

La Mousmé, July 1888
Oil on canvas, 74 x 60 cm
National Gallery of Art, Washington D.C.

=== The Zouave ===
Van Gogh, excited to have a model for a portrait, worked on the portraits of a Zouave in June 1888 in Arles. Van Gogh described him as a boy, with a small face, large neck and intense eyes. A half-length portrait was made of the tanned man with bright colors he called a "savage combination of incongruous tones". The Zouave's uniform was blue with red-orange braids, a red cap and two yellow stars on his chest, all placed against the background of a green door and orange bricks. Unsatisfied with the painting, he called it "ugly and unsuccessful", but thought the challenge might expand his artistic skill. Van Gogh also made a drawing, of which he was not particularly pleased, and a painting of the Zouave against a white wall.

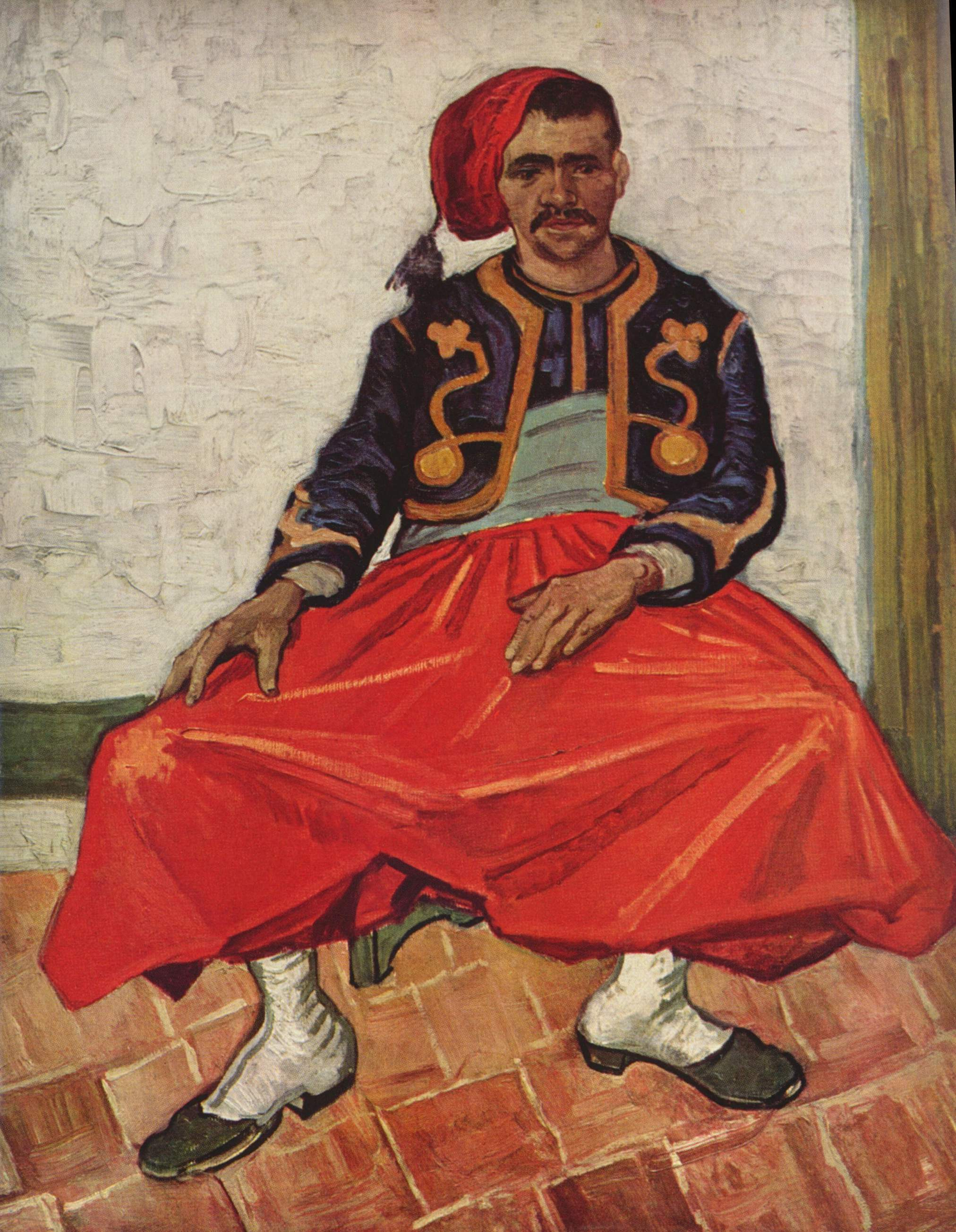
Le Zouave
June 1888
Oil on canvas, 82 x 65 cm
Private collection (F424)

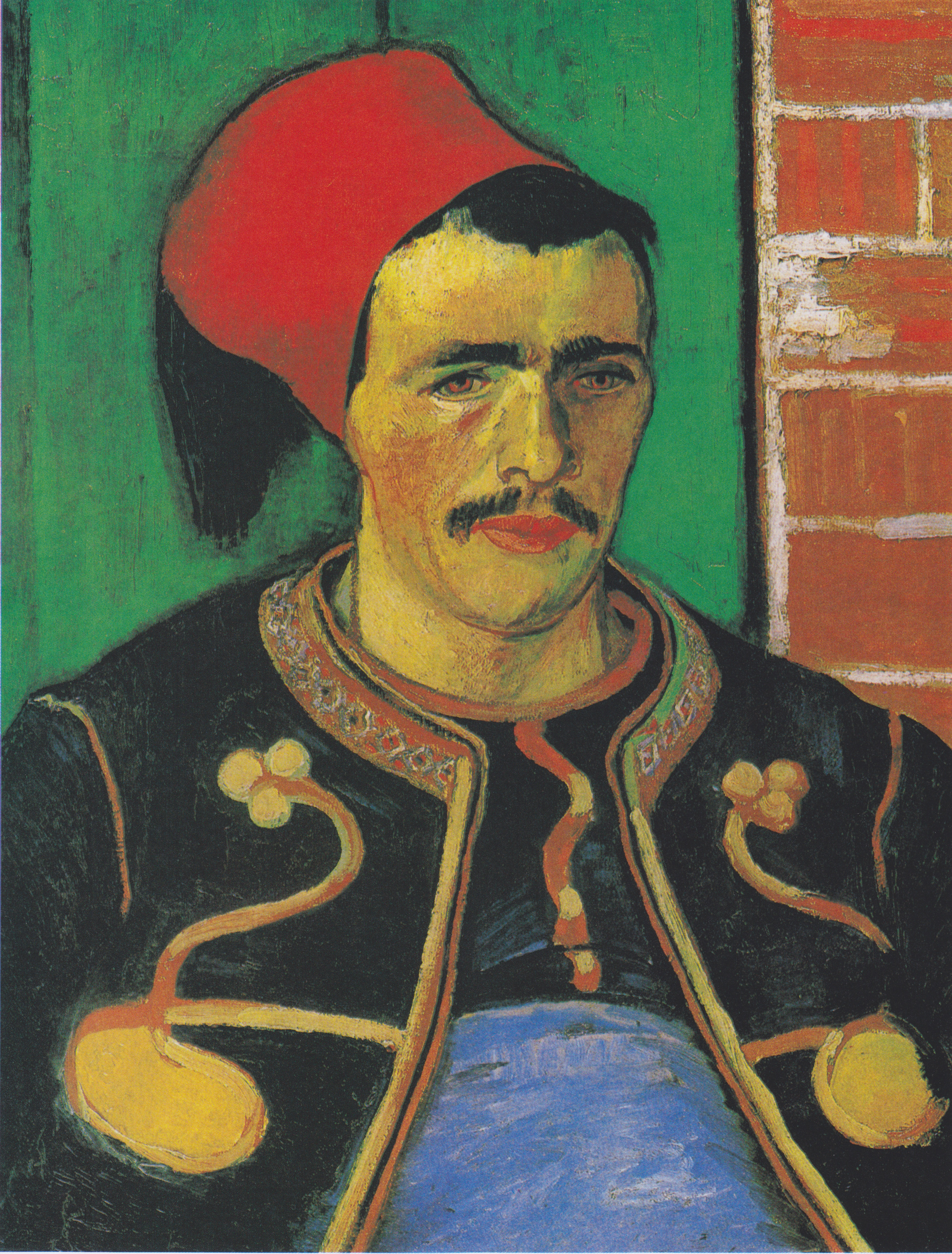
Le Zouave (half-figure)
June 1888
Van Gogh Museum, Amsterdam (F423)

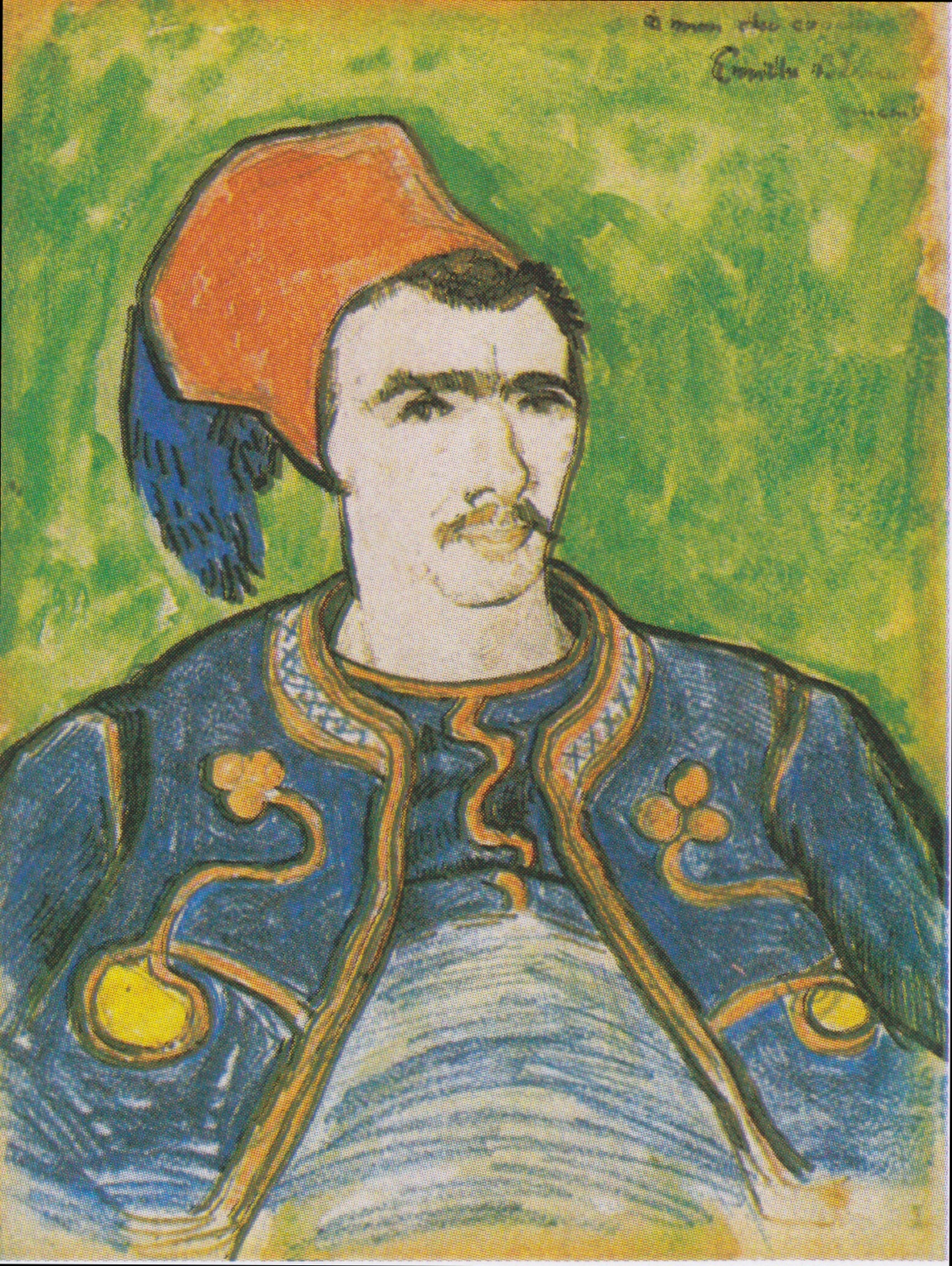
The Zouave, watercolor, 1888, Metropolitan Museum of Art, New York (F1482)

=== Head of a Girl ===
This portrait, and The Zouave, was one of the two portraits by van Gogh in 1888 of anonymous subjects, that he sent to his Australian artist friend John Russell. Like The Zouave, Van Gogh compared his subject to an animal. He called the girl "a dirty mudlark".

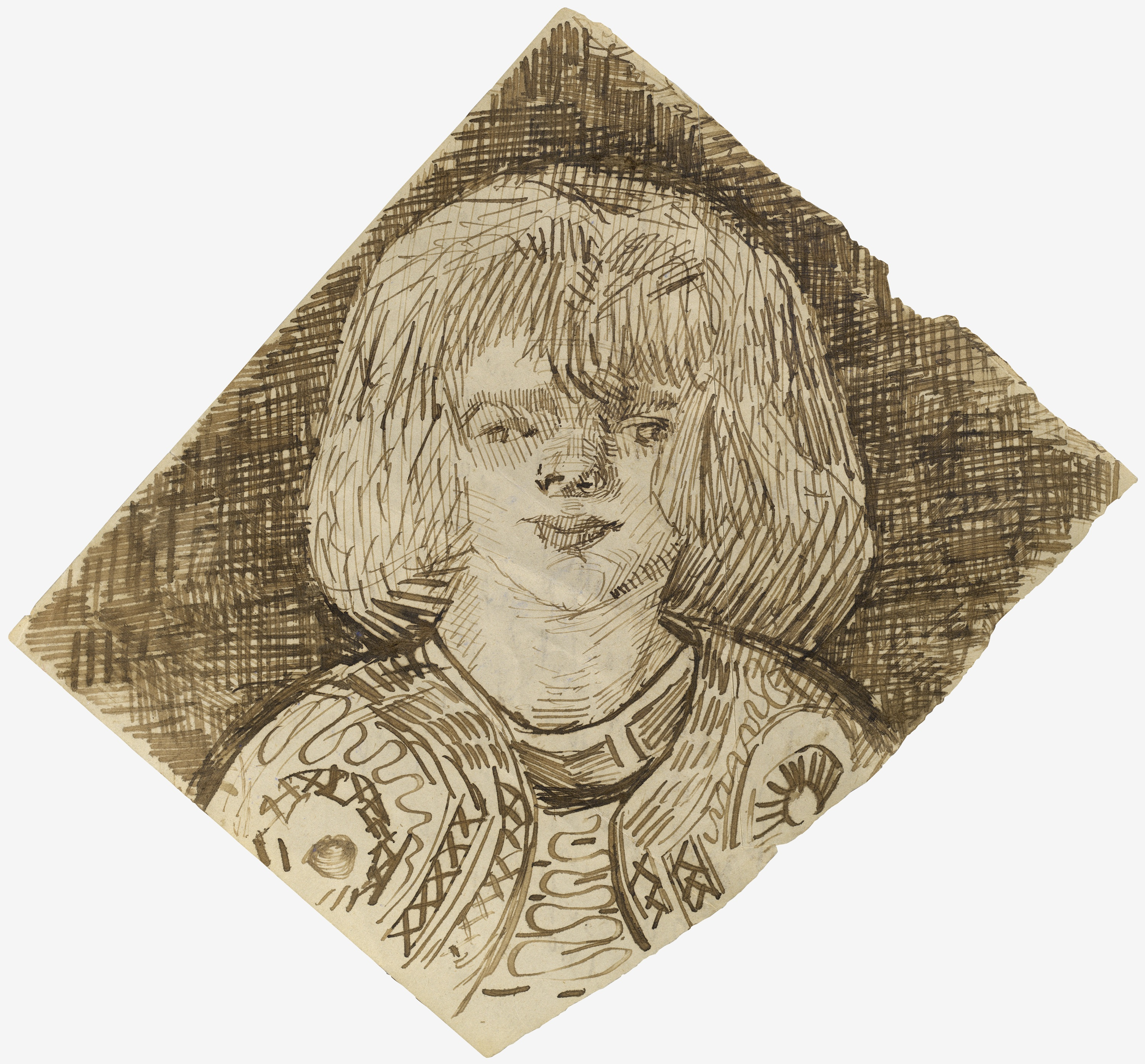
Head of a Girl, Late June 1888
Reed pen and ink on wove paper, 18 x 19.5 cm
Guggenheim Museum

=== The Lover: Paul-Eugène Milliet ===
Paul-Eugène Milliet was a 2nd Lieutenant at the 3rd Zouave Regiment which had quarters at the Caserne Calvin located on Boulevard des Lices in Arles. Vincent van Gogh gave him drawing lessons, and in return Milliet took a roll of paintings by Van Gogh to Paris, when in mid August he was passing the French capital on his way to the North, where Milliet spent his holidays. On his return to Arles, at the end of September 1888, Milliet handed over a batch of Ukiyo-e woodcuts and other prints selected by Vincent's brother Theo from their collection. In the days that followed Vincent executed this portrait of Milliet.

In the first version of Van Gogh's Bedroom in Arles, executed in October 1888, Milliet's portrait is shown hanging to the right of the portrait of Eugène Boch.

Decades later, when Milliet had retired to the 7th arrondissement in Paris, his memories of Van Gogh were recorded by Pierre Weiller, at this time living on lease in a building owned by Milliet, and published in 1955, after Milliet's death.

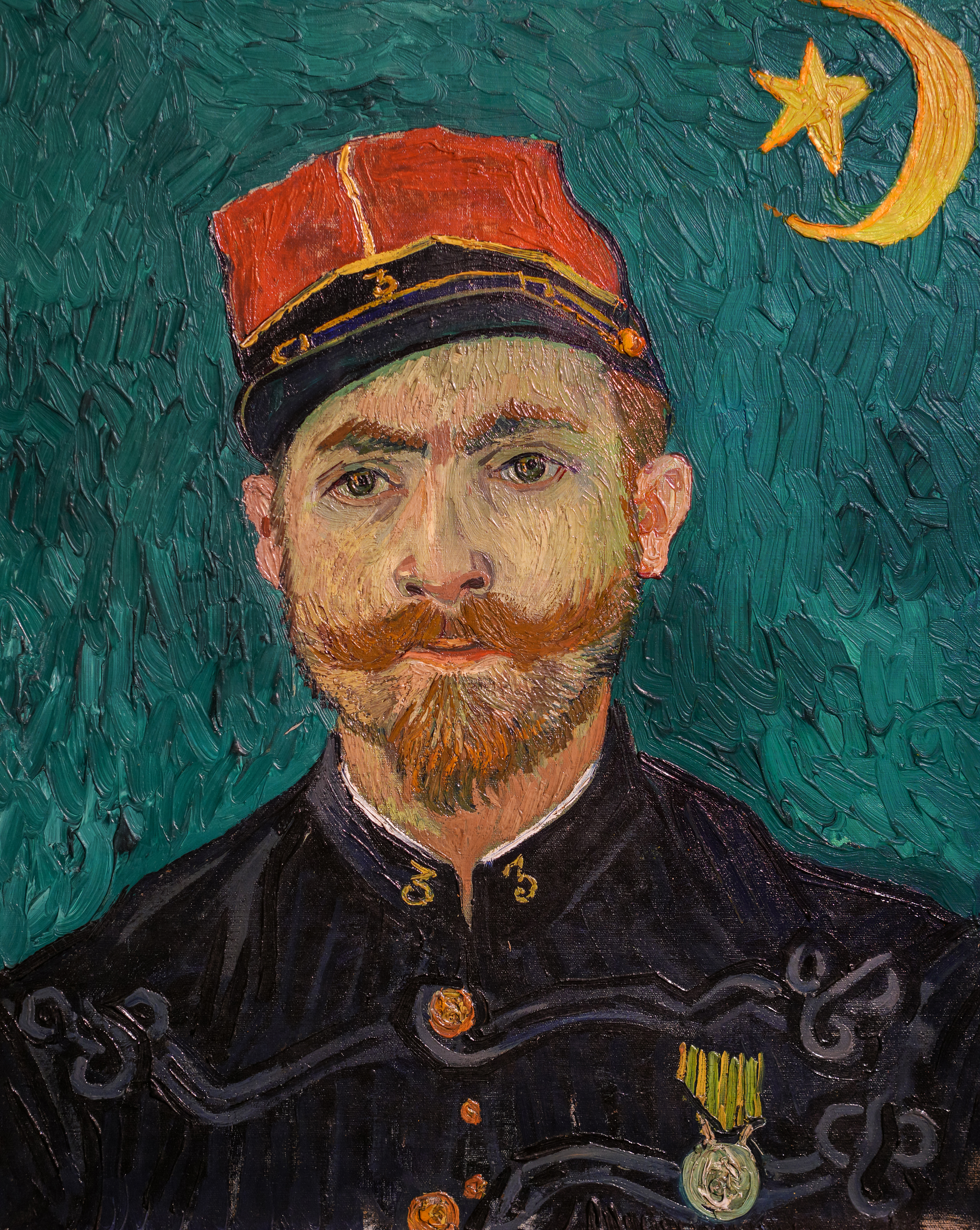
Paul-Eugène Milliet (The Lover), 1888
Oil on canvas, 60 x 49 cm
Kröller-Müller Museum, Otterlo (F473)

Bedroom in Arles (1st Version)

=== The Mudlark ===
Girl with Ruffled Hair (The Mudlark) was painted by Van Gogh when he lived in Arles. The work resides at Musée des Beaux-Arts, La Chaux-de-Fonds, Switzerland (F535). See also Paintings of Children (Van Gogh series).

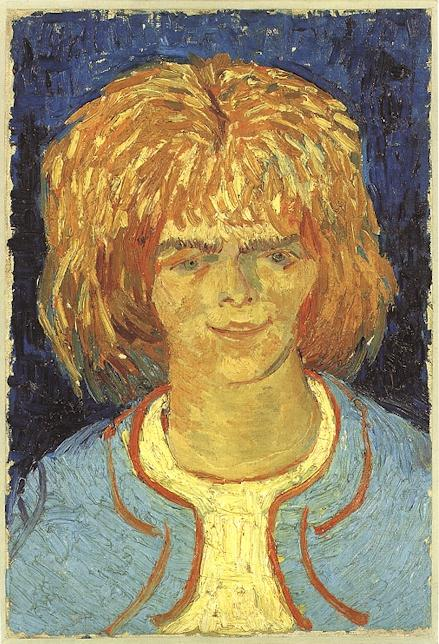
Girl with Ruffled Hair (The Mudlark), Musée des Beaux-Arts, La Chaux-de-Fonds, Switzerland (F535).

=== Old Woman of Arles ===
Van Gogh's Old woman of Arles was made soon after he arrived in Arles. He wrote to his brother Theo, "I believe that there are real opportunities for portraiture here. While people here are enormously ignorant of painting in general, when it comes to their own appearance and their own lives, they are much more artistic than in the North."

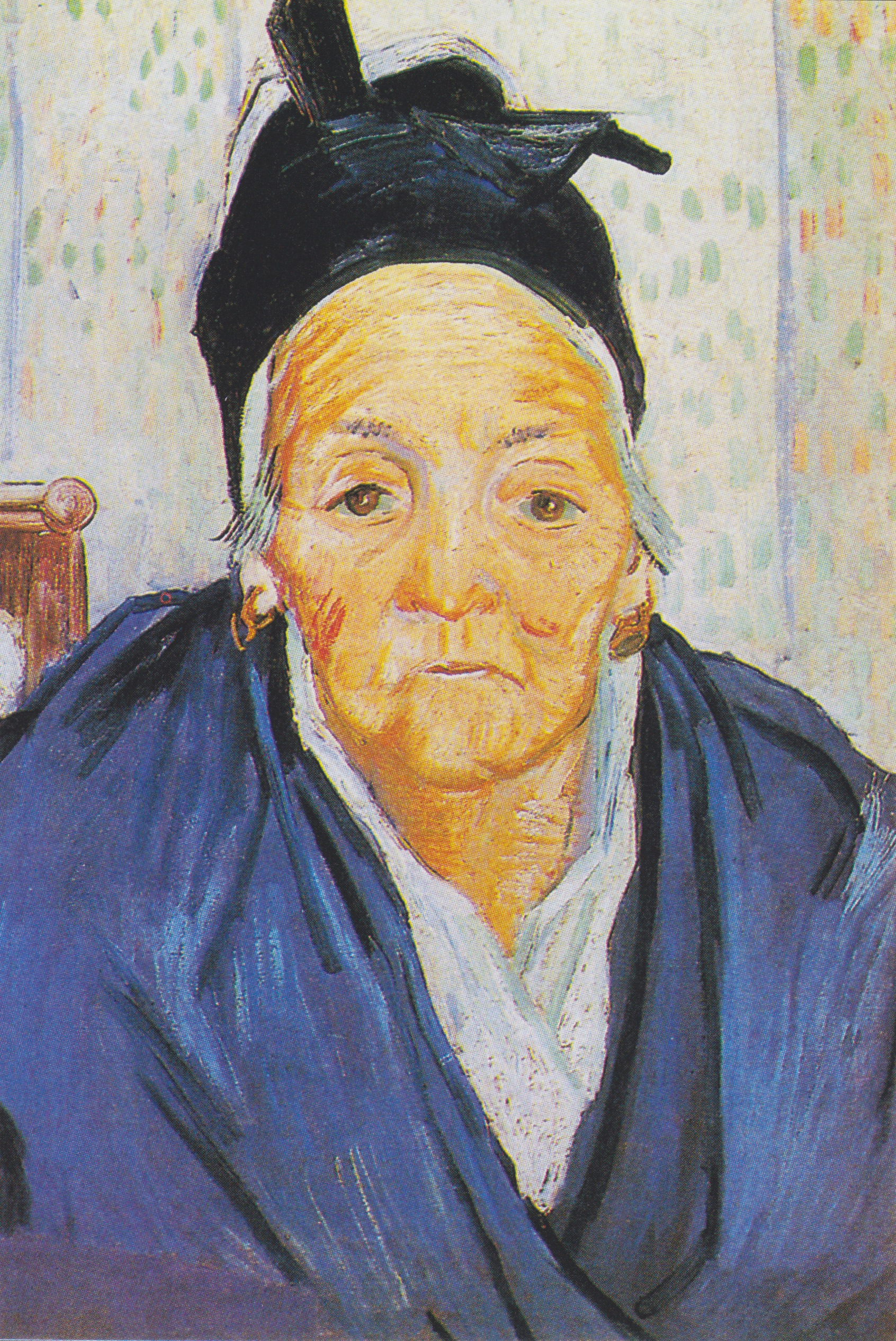
An Old Woman of Arles
1888
Van Gogh Museum, Amsterdam, Netherlands (F390)

=== One-eyed Man ===
The One-eyed Man is a portrait of a patient at the Saint-Paul asylum in Saint-Rémy. Van Gogh used sweeping brushstrokes in the painting made with green in the background, the man's coat and touches in his face. In the hospital Van Gogh found that in the presence of other patients he became more calm about his mental state. In a letter to his mother he wrote, "At the moment I am working on a portrait of one of the patients here. It is odd that if one is with them for a time, and has grown used to them, one no longer thinks them mad."

Since Van Gogh was not in Saint-Paul's until 1889, possibly the patient and artwork that Van Gogh referred to in the letter to his mother was about Portrait of a Patient.

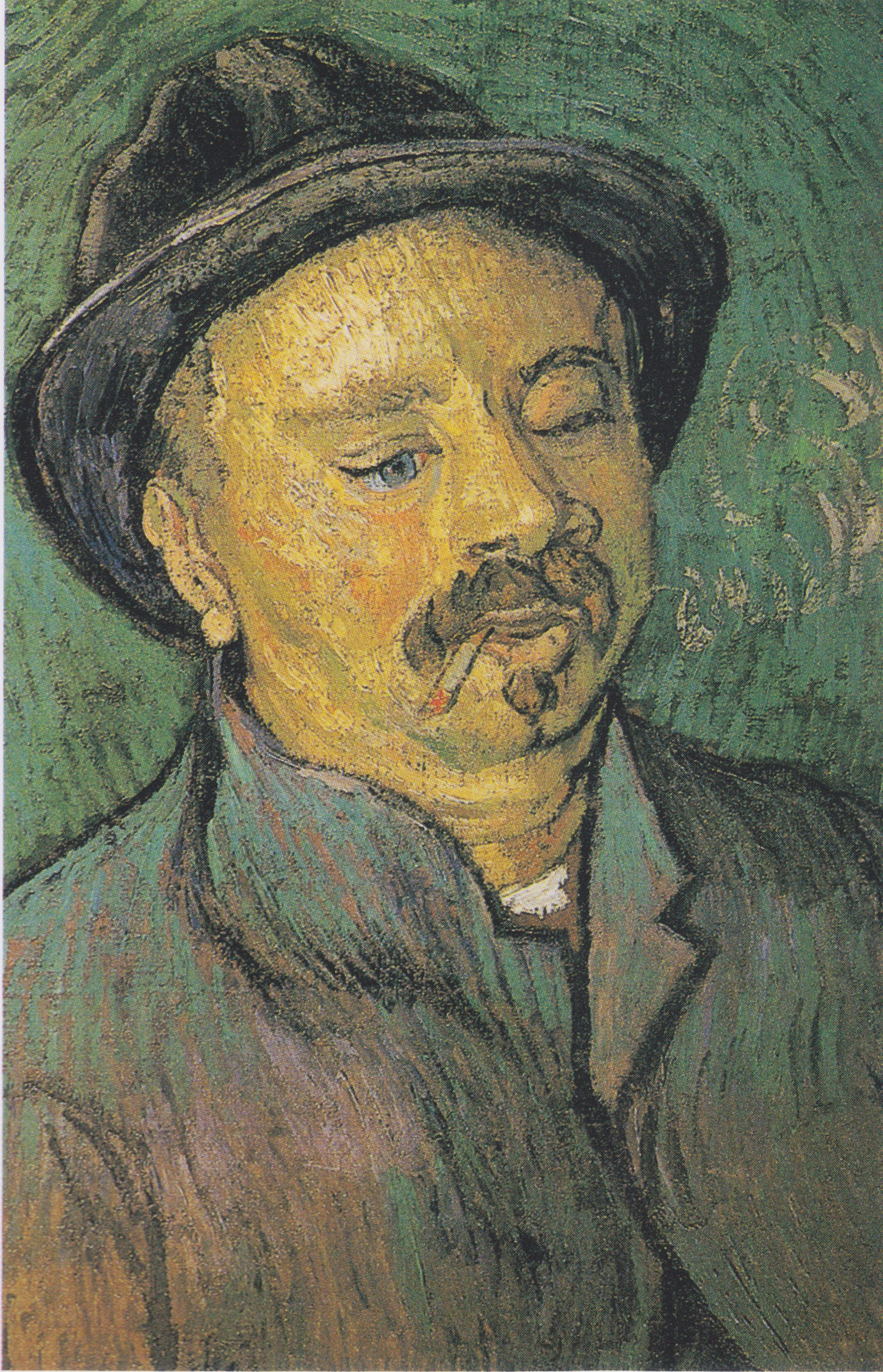
Portrait of a One-Eyed Man
1888
Van Gogh Museum, Amsterdam (F532)

=== Paul Gauguin ===
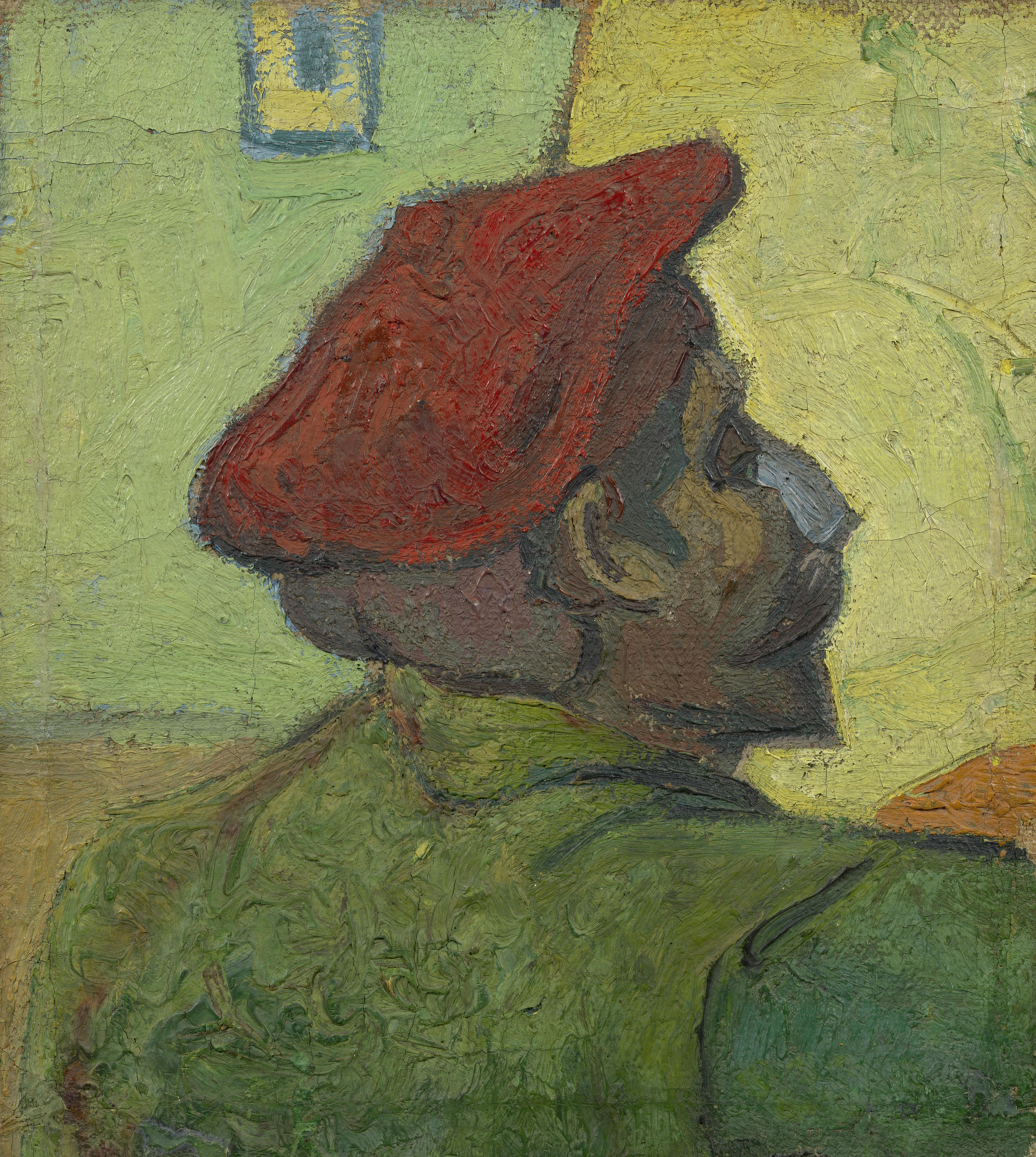
Paul Gauguin (Man in a Red Beret)
1888
Van Gogh Museum, Amsterdam (F546)

=== The Poet: Eugène Boch ===
Eugène Boch (1855–1941) was a Belgian painter, born in Saint-Vaast, Hainaut, who was the younger brother of Anna Boch, a founding member of Les XX. Born into a wealthy dynasty of manufacturers of fine china and ceramics, still active today under the firm of Villeroy & Boch, Eugène Boch enrolled in the private atelier of Léon Bonnat in Paris, in 1879. Since 1882, when Bonnat closed his atelier, he studied at the atelier of Fernand Cormon. Paintings of him were admitted to the Salon in 1882, 1883 and 1885. In June 1888, he was introduced by Dodge MacKnight to Vincent van Gogh.

The portrait was executed in the first days of September 1888, a few days before Boch's departure. In the first version of Van Gogh's Bedroom, executed in October 1888, this portrait is shown hanging to the left of the portrait of Paul-Eugène Milliet. Arranged this way, both portraits may have formed part of the Décoration for the Yellow House.

When Eugène Boch died in 1941, he bequeathed The Poet (that is Van Gogh's title for his portrait of Eugène Boch, which Boch received from Johanna van Gogh-Bonger as a present in July 1891) to the Louvre.

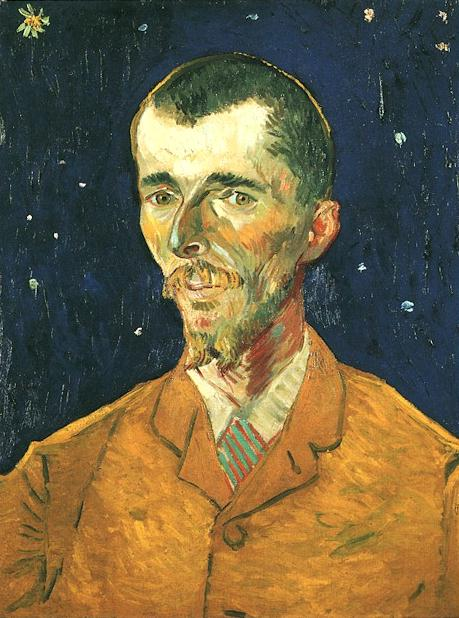
Eugène Boch (The Poet), 1888
Oil on canvas, 60 x 45 cm
Musée d'Orsay, Paris (F462)

=== Portrait of the Artist's Mother ===
Portrait of the Artist's Mother is a painting Vincent van Gogh made in 1888 of his mother, Anna Carbentus van Gogh, from a black-and-white photograph. In September 1888, Van Gogh, answering to a letter of his sister Wil who had told him of a recent photograph of their mother, asked for a print. About a week later he received it, but "troubled by the black," sat down to paint a copy based on this likeness: Van Gogh's initial introduction to art was through his mother, an amateur artist. After years of strained relationship with family members, Van Gogh excitedly shared some of his works his mother would cherish most, those of flowers and natural settings. In this painting of his mother, Van Gogh captures her dignified, proud nature.

Van Gogh made the painting, Memory of the Garden at Etten, to depict an older woman who he envisioned as his mother and a younger woman in a plaid shawl to represent his sister Wil and the lovely gardens of the Netherlands. In a letter to his sister Wil, Van Gogh said he had "an impression of you like those in Dicken's novels."

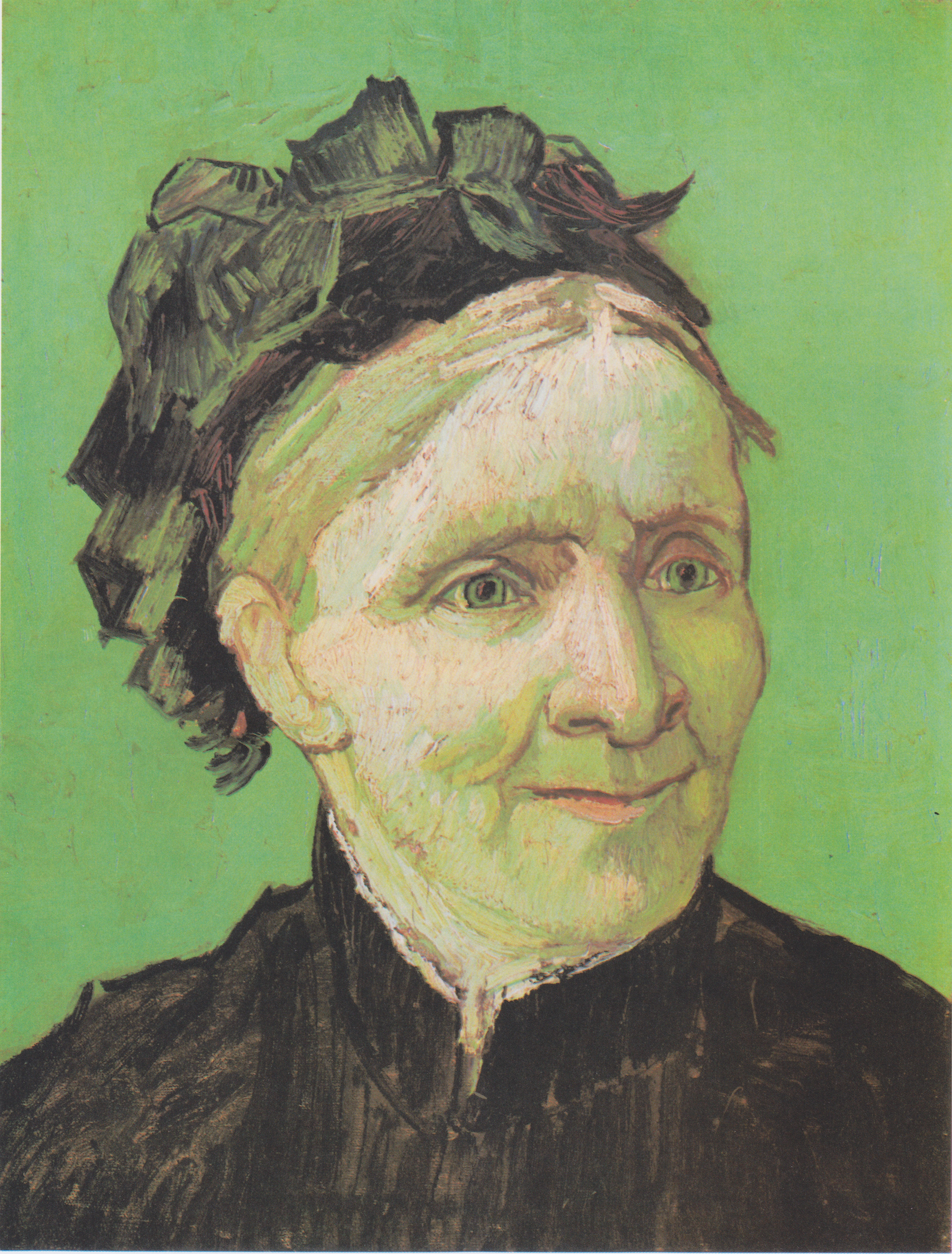
Portrait of Artist's Mother
October 1888
The Norton Simon Museum of Art, Pasadena, California (F477)

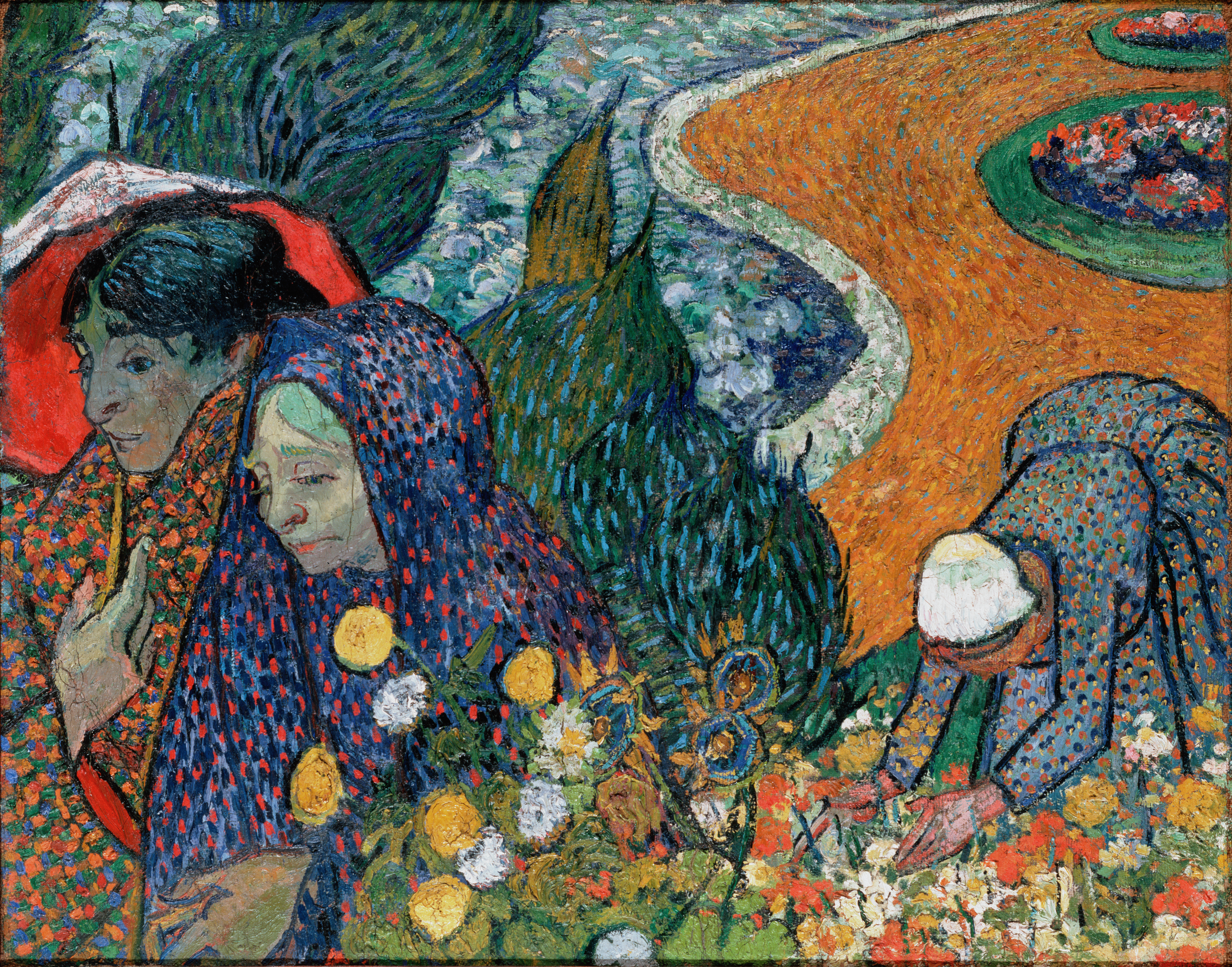
Memory of the Garden at Etten (Ladies of Arles)
1888
The Hermitage, St. Petersburg, Russia (F496)

=== The Roulin Family ===
The Roulin Family is group of portrait paintings that Vincent van Gogh executed in Arles in 1888 and 1889 of Joseph, his wife Augustine and their three children: Armand, Camille and Marcelle. This series is unique in many ways. Although Van Gogh loved to paint portraits, it was difficult for financial and other reasons for him to find models. So, finding an entire family that agreed to sit for paintings, in fact for several sittings each was a bounty. Joseph Roulin became a particularly good, loyal and supporting friend to Van Gogh during his stay in Arles. To represent a man he truly admired was important to him. The family, with children ranging in age from four months to seventeen years, also gave him the opportunity to produces works of individuals in several different stages of life. Rather than making photographic-like works, Van Gogh used his imagination, colors and themes artistically and creatively to evoke desired emotions from the audience.

==== Le Facteur: Joseph Roulin ====
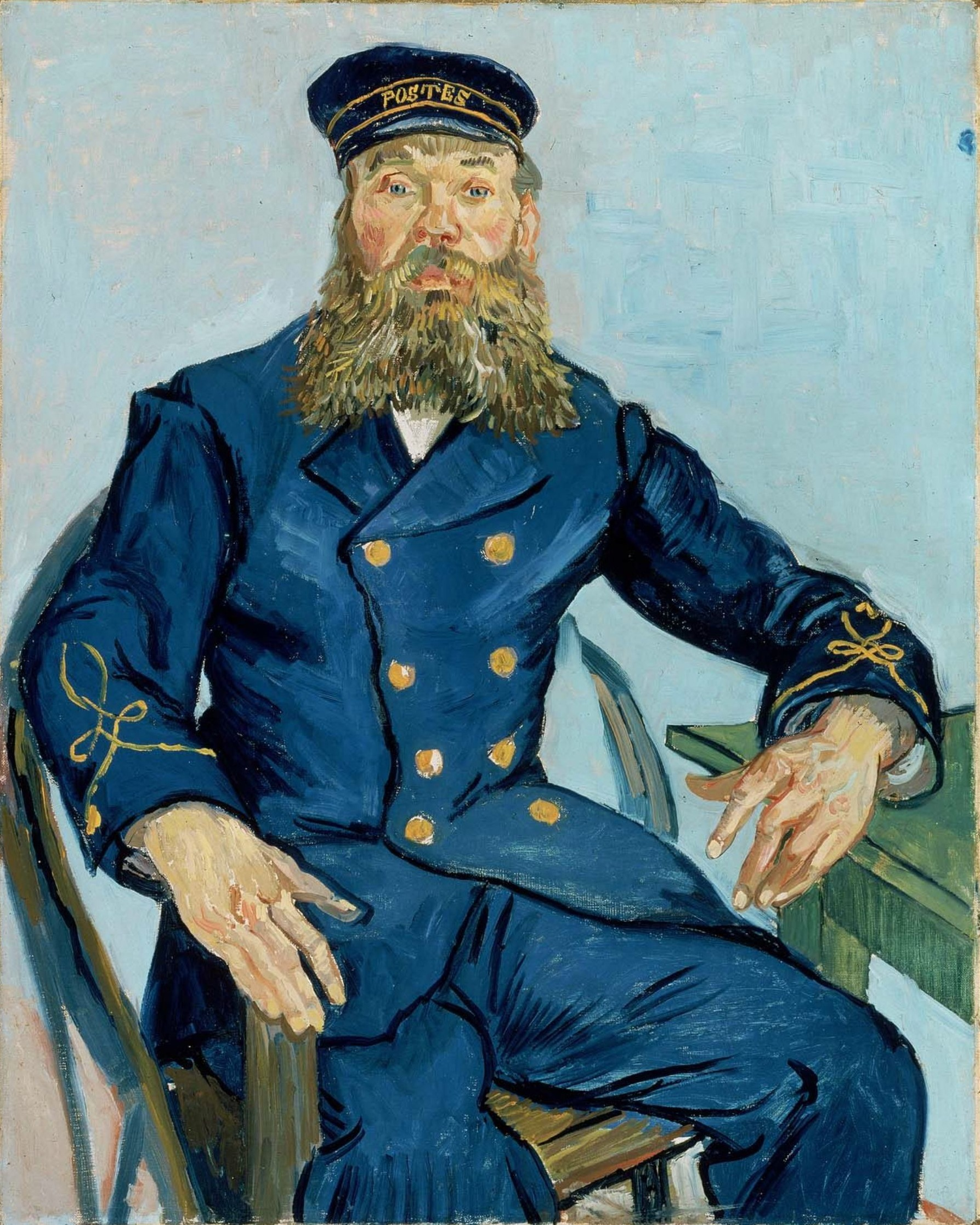
Portrait of the Postman Joseph Roulin (1841-1903) early August 1888, Museum of Fine Arts, Boston (F432)

While Van Gogh was living in Arles, Joseph Roulin was working at the railway station, both places close to their lodgings: Roulin and his family in a dead-end street, and Van Gogh just around the corner, at 2 Place Lamartine - and both frequented the Café run by the Ginoux couple, some footsteps further; there Van Gogh had lodged, before he moved to the Yellow House. Roulin was married to Augustine. They had three children: Armand, Camille and Marcelle. Van Gogh painted each of Roulin's family members several times between 1888 and 1889.

External videos
- Barnes Takeout: Art Talk on Vincent van Gogh’s The Postman, 13:29, Barnes Foundation

While in Arles, Vincent van Gogh became friends with the postman. Van Gogh painted several portraits of Roulin and his family. Roulin's “silent gravity and tenderness,” and his “strangely pure and touching” voice inspired Van Gogh to paint him, commemorating their friendship.

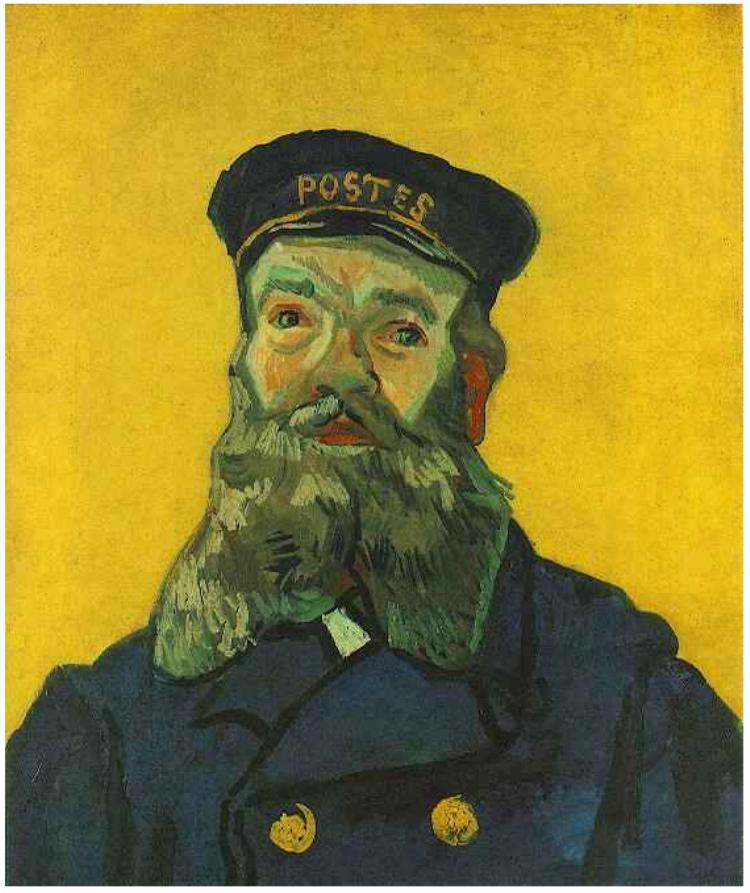
The Father or Portrait of the Postman Joseph Roulin, November–December 1888, Kunstmuseum Winterthur, Switzerland (F434)

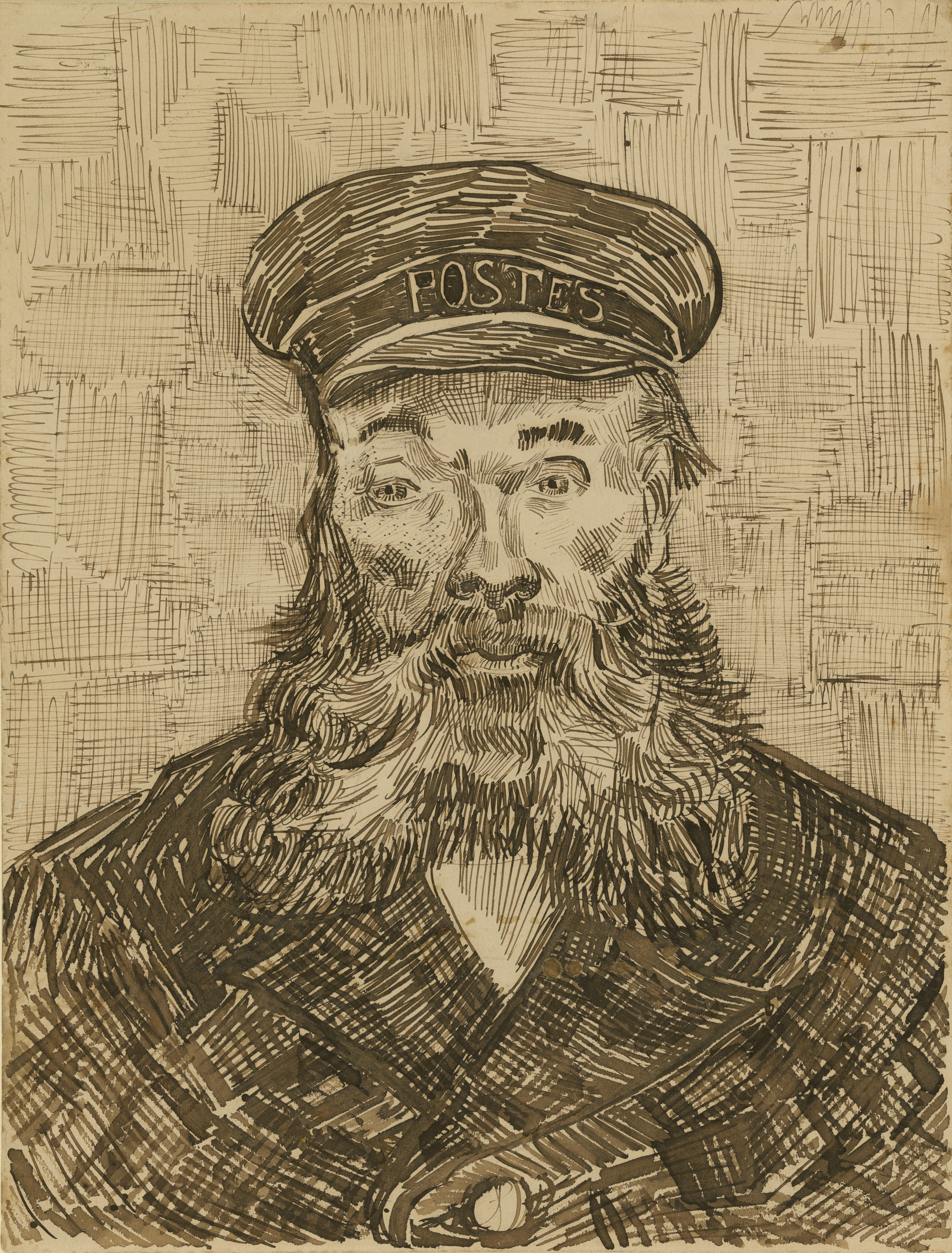
Drawing after the second version, Getty Museum

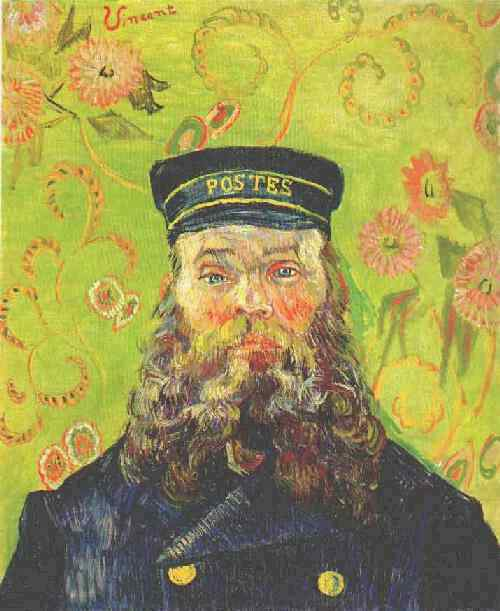
Portrait of the Postman Joseph Roulin, April 1888, Barnes Foundation, Merion Station, PA (F435)

==== Augustine ====
Augustine Roulin was born on 9 October 1851 in Lambesc and died on 5 April 1930. After her husband had posed for several works with Van Gogh, Augustine sat for Van Gogh and Paul Gauguin in the Yellow House the two men shared. During the sitting, she kept her gaze on Gauguin, possibly for reassurance because, according to her daughter, she was not comfortable in the presence of Van Gogh.

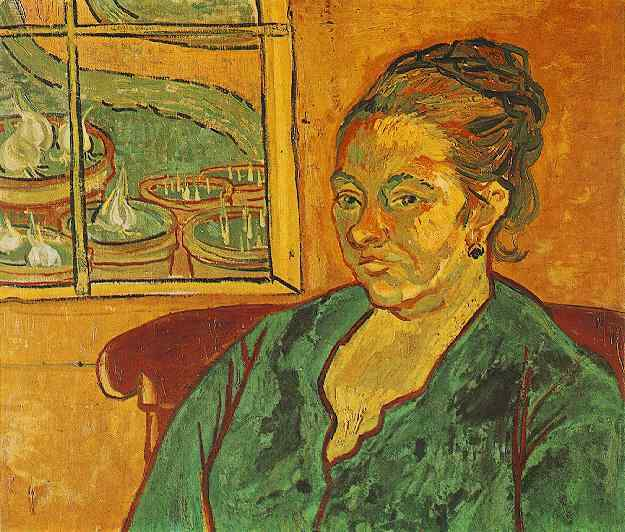
The Mother or Portrait of Madame Augustine Roulin, Nov-Dec 1888, Oskar Reinhart Collection "Am Römerholz", Winterthur (F503)

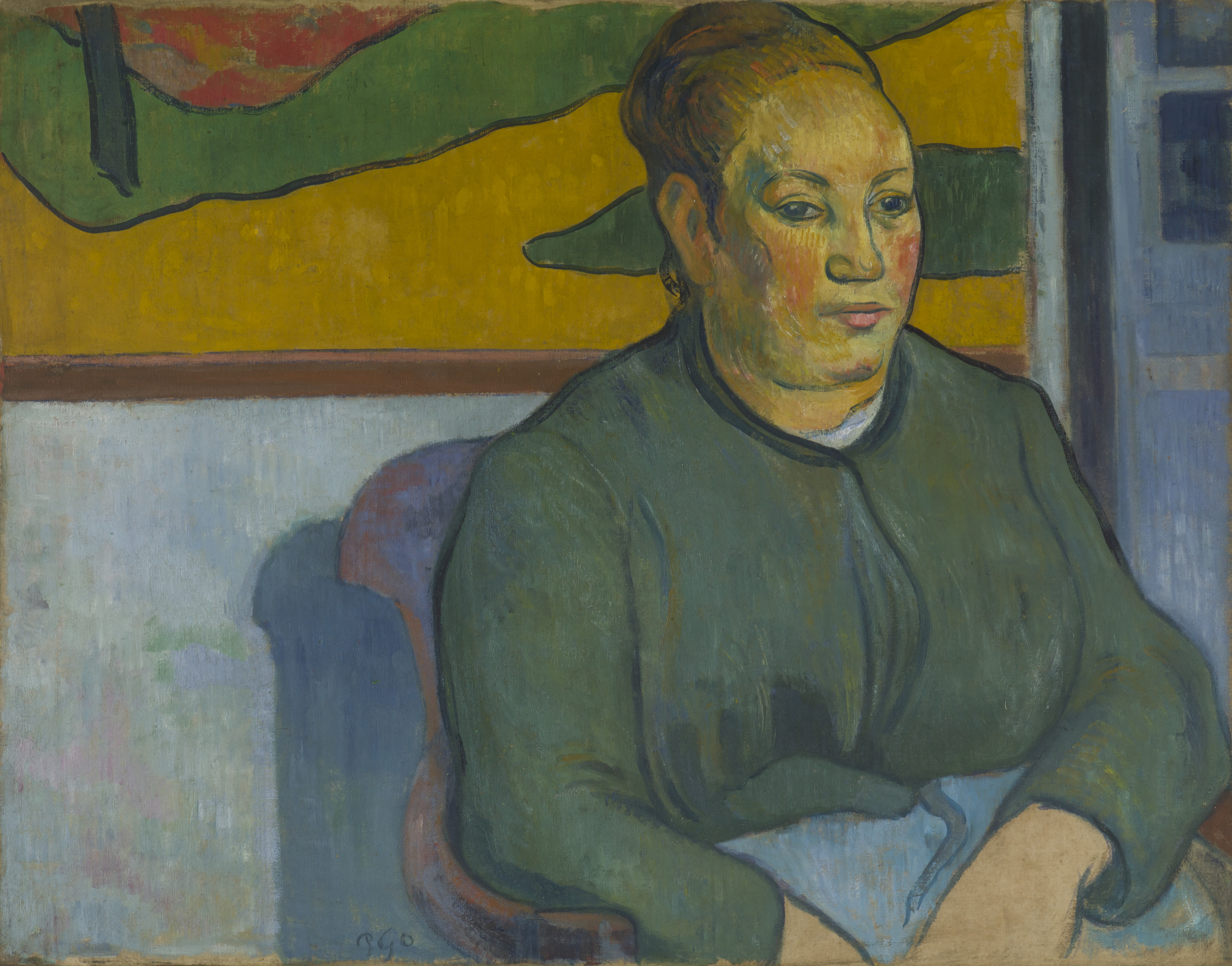
Paul Gauguin, Portrait of Madame Roulin

==== La Berceuse (Augustine) ====
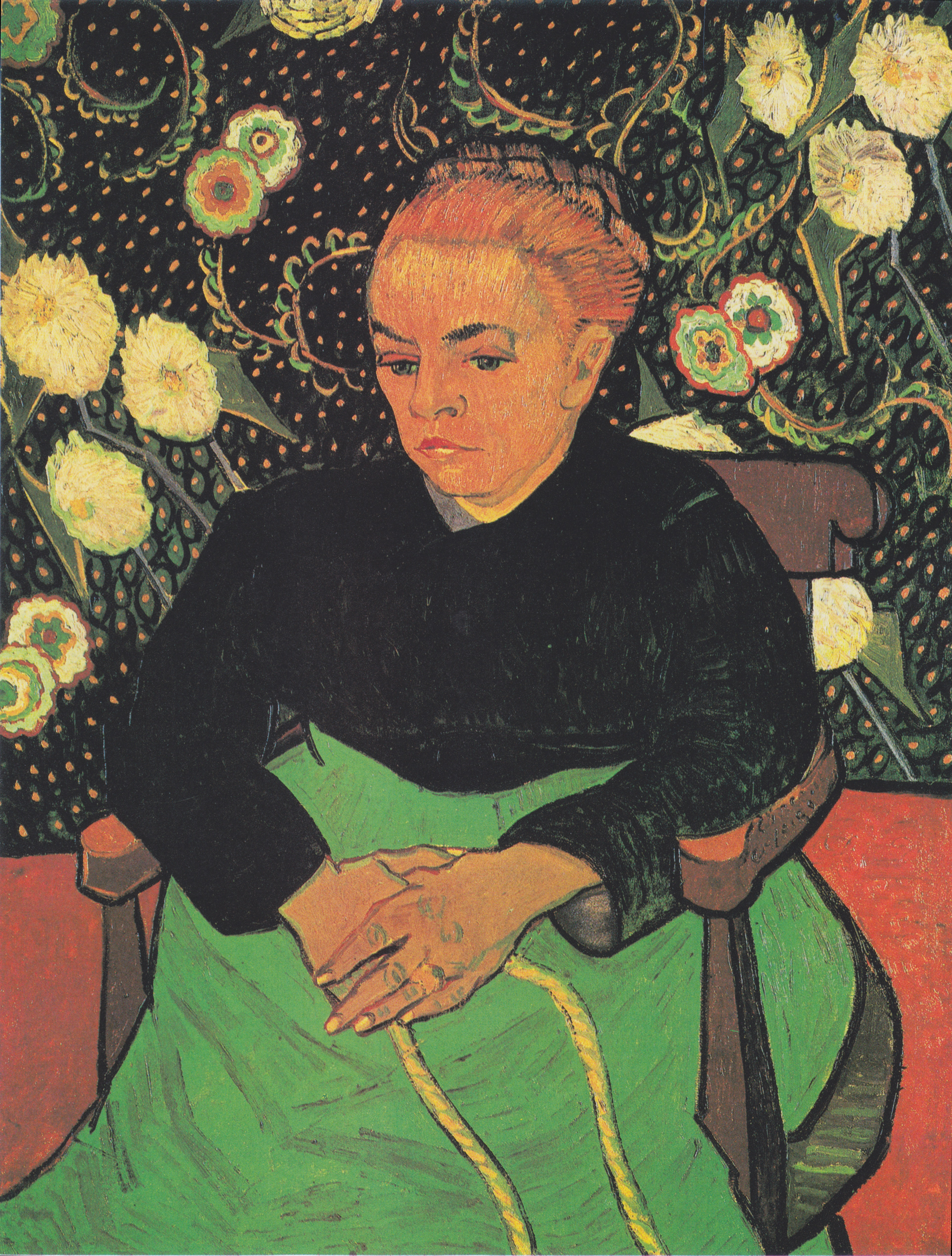
La Berceuse (Augustine Roulin), February 1889, The Art Institute of Chicago, Illinois (F508)

In addition to the mother-daughter works where Marcelle is visible, Van Gogh also created several La Berceuse works where Augustine rocked her unseen cradle by a string.

Van Gogh labeled the group of work La Berceuse meaning "our lullaby or the woman rocking the cradle."

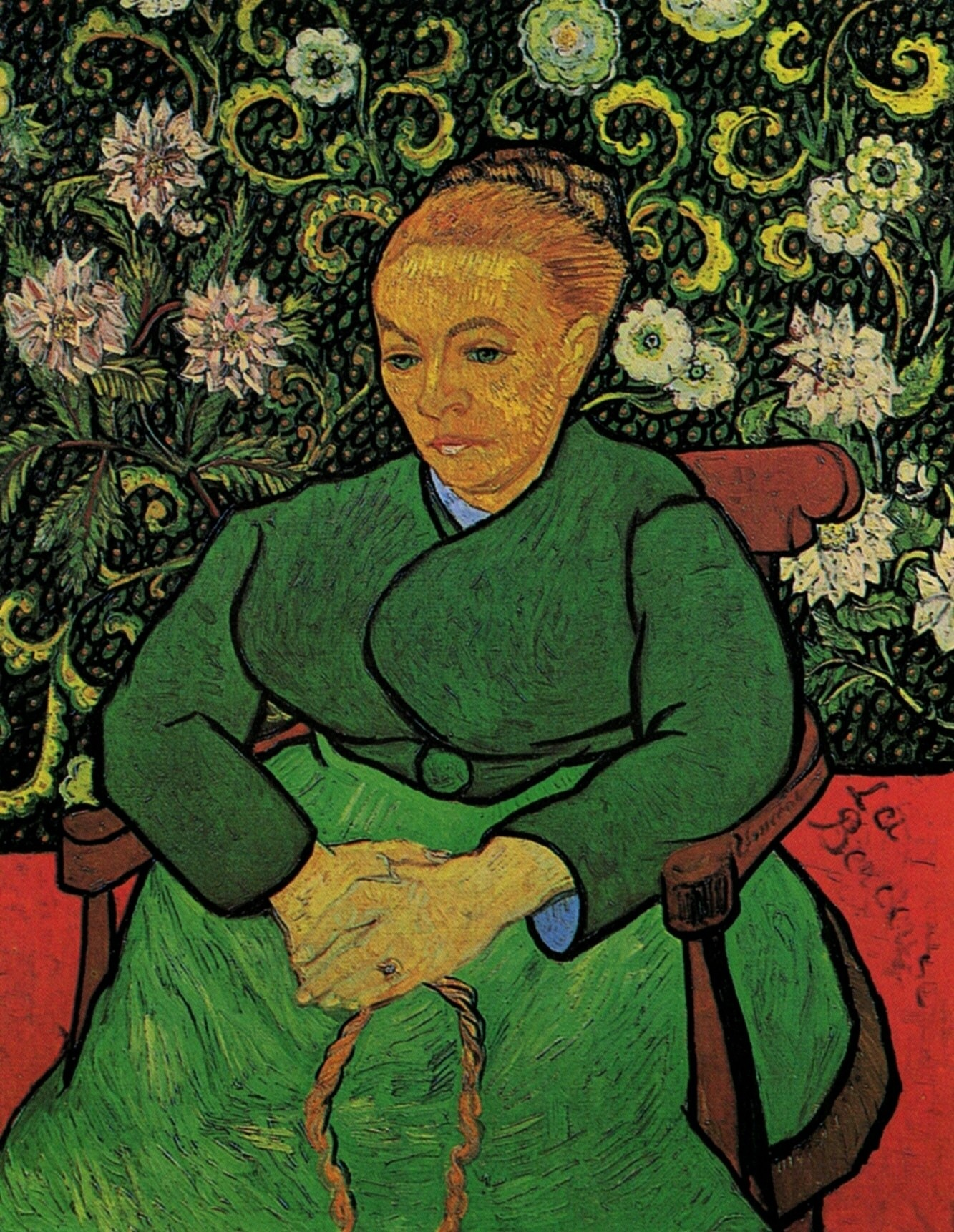
La Berceuse (Augustine Roulin), December 1888, Kröller-Müller Museum, Otterlo, Netherlands (F504)

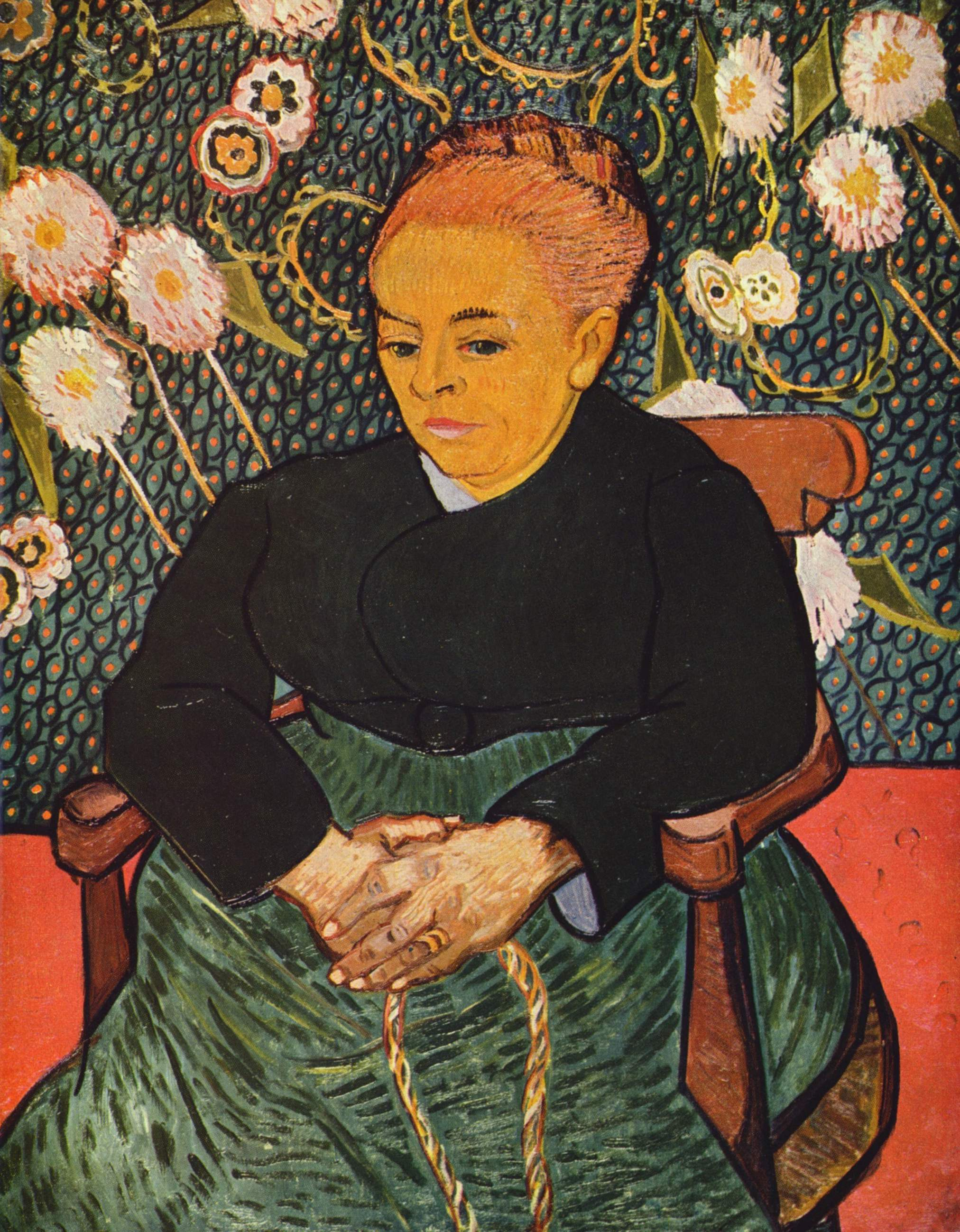
La Berceuse (Augustine Roulin), Museum of Fine Arts, Boston (F unk)

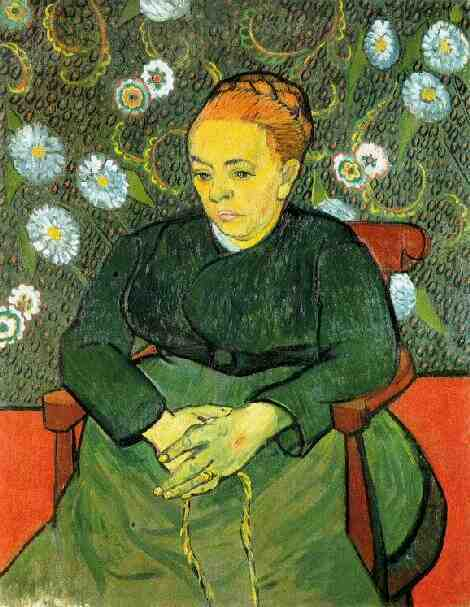
La Berceuse (Augustine Roulin), March 1889, Stedelijk Museum, Amsterdam, Netherlands (F507)

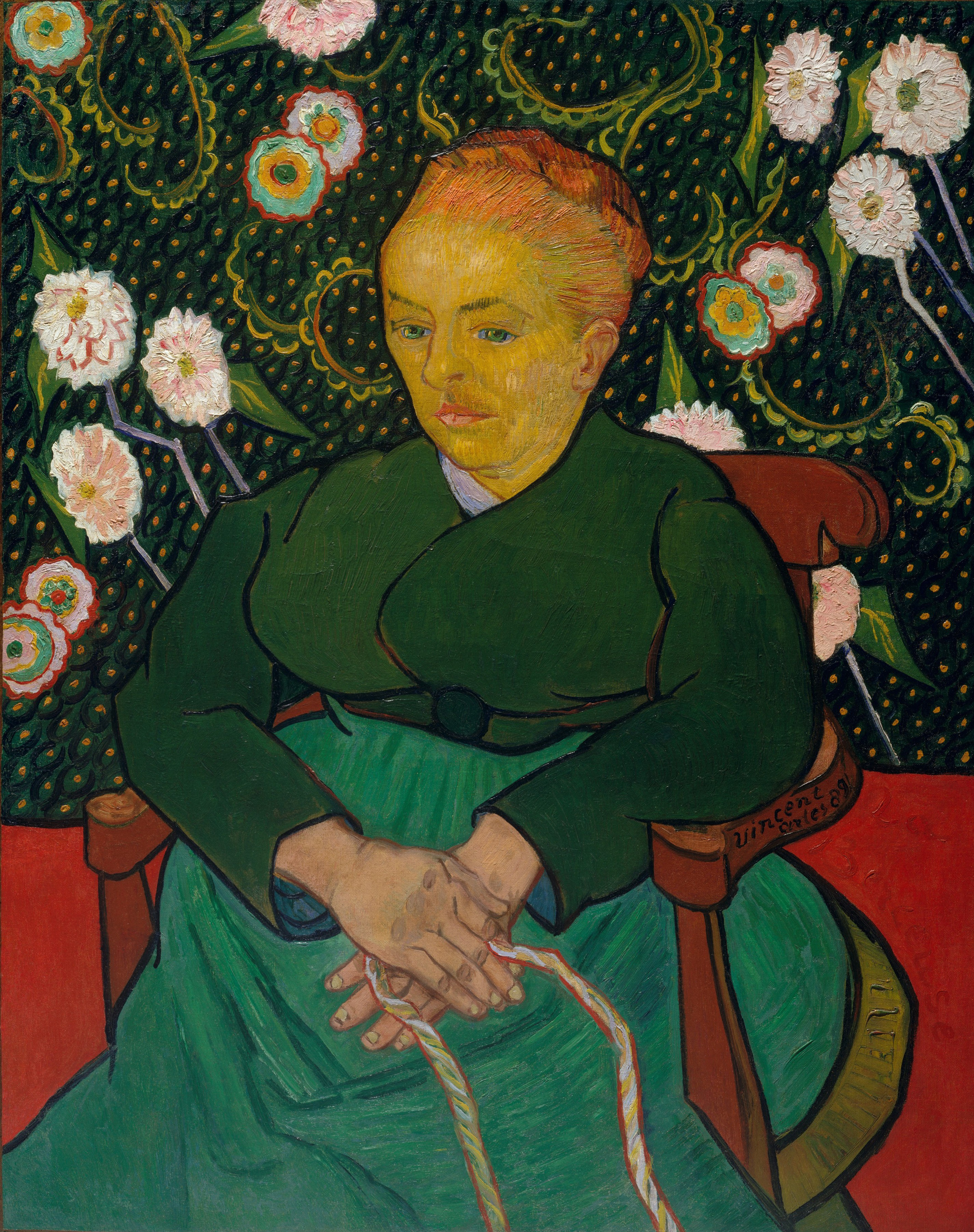
La Berceuse (Augustine Roulin), January 1889, The Metropolitan Museum of Art, New York (F505)

==== Armand ====
Armand Roulin, the eldest son, was born on 5 May 1871 in Lambesc, and died on 14 November 1945. He was 17 years of age when portrayed by Van Gogh.

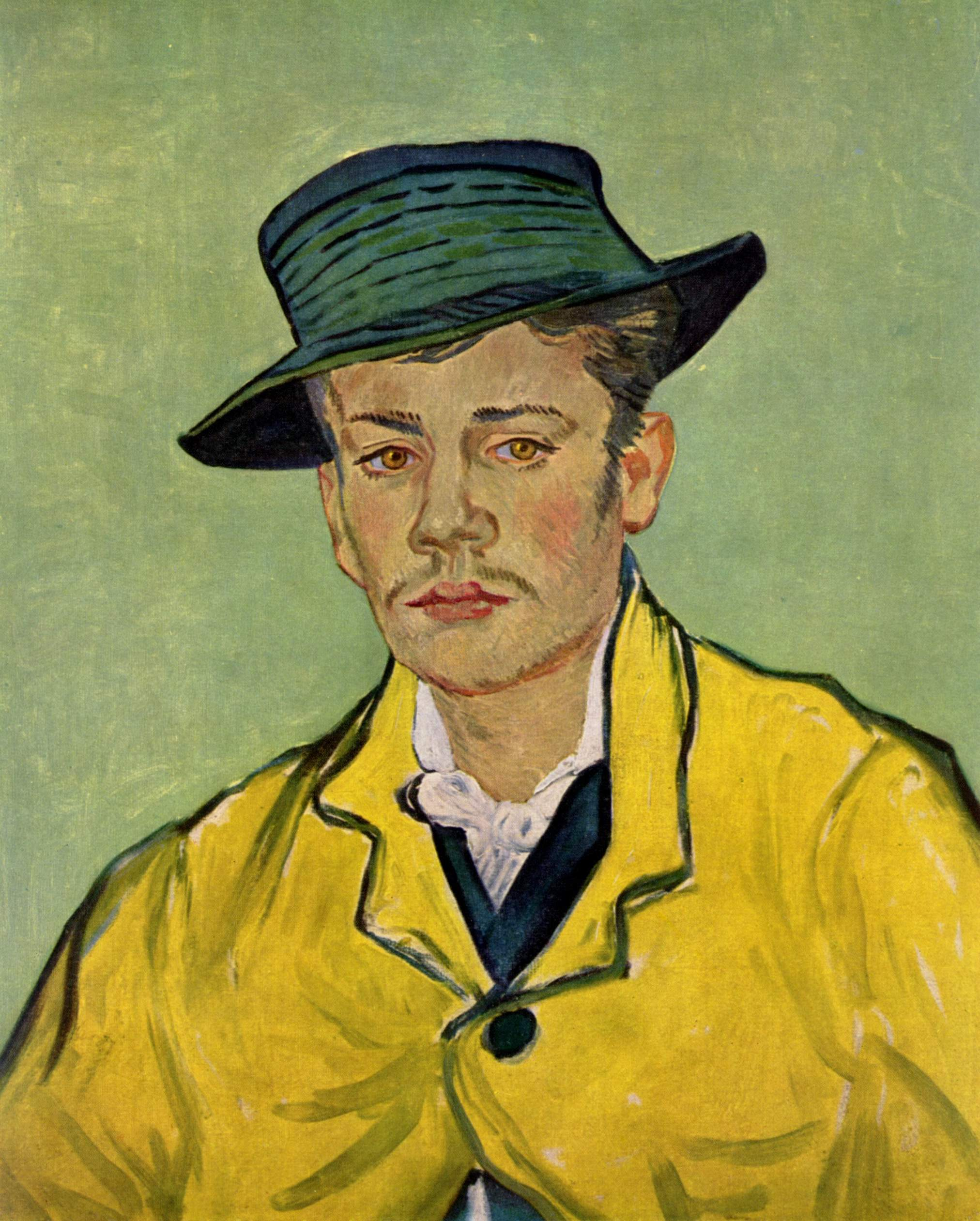
Portrait of Armand Roulin, 1888, Museum Folkwang, Essen (F492)

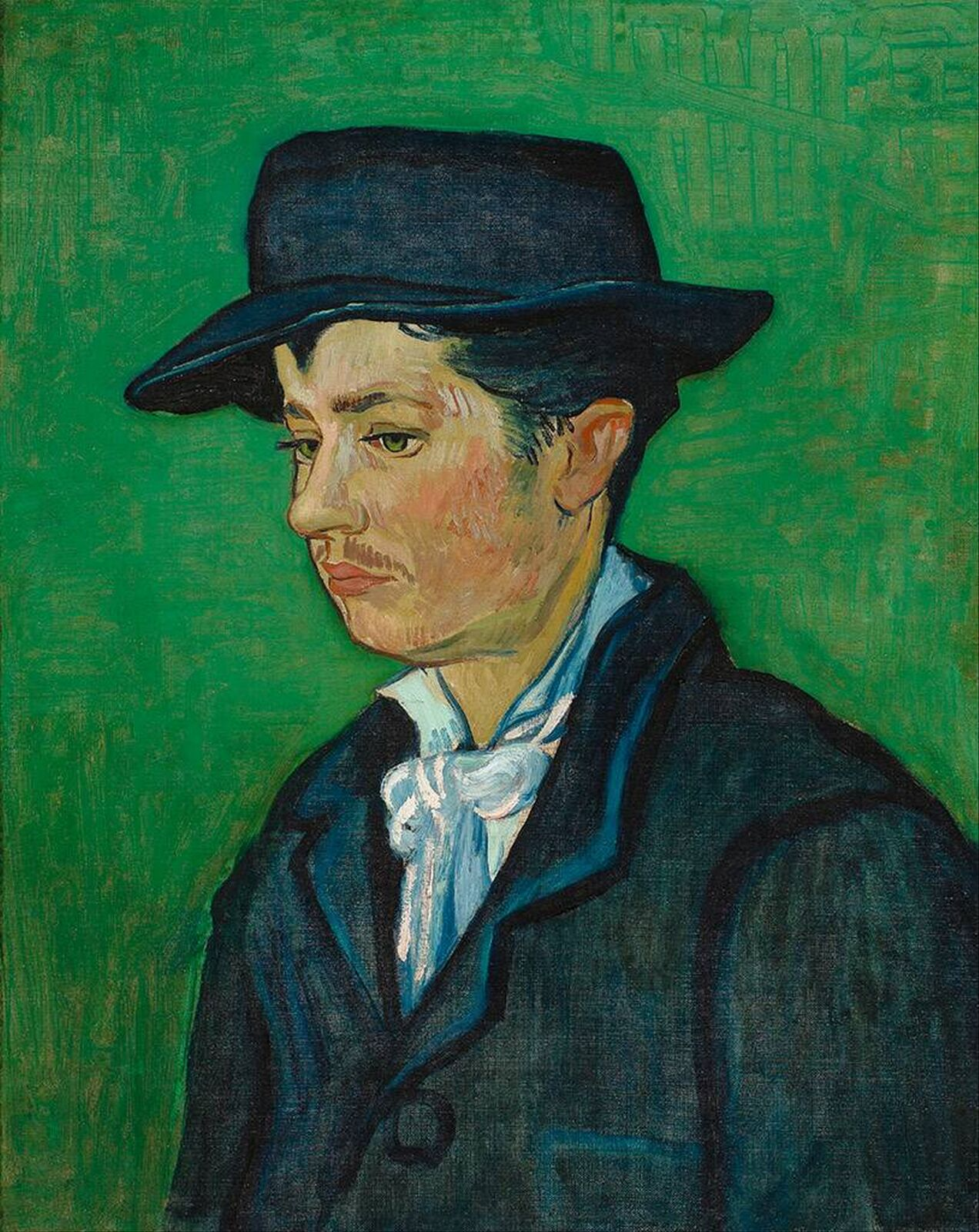
Portrait of Armand Roulin, 1888, Museum Boijmans Van Beuningen, Rotterdam (F493)

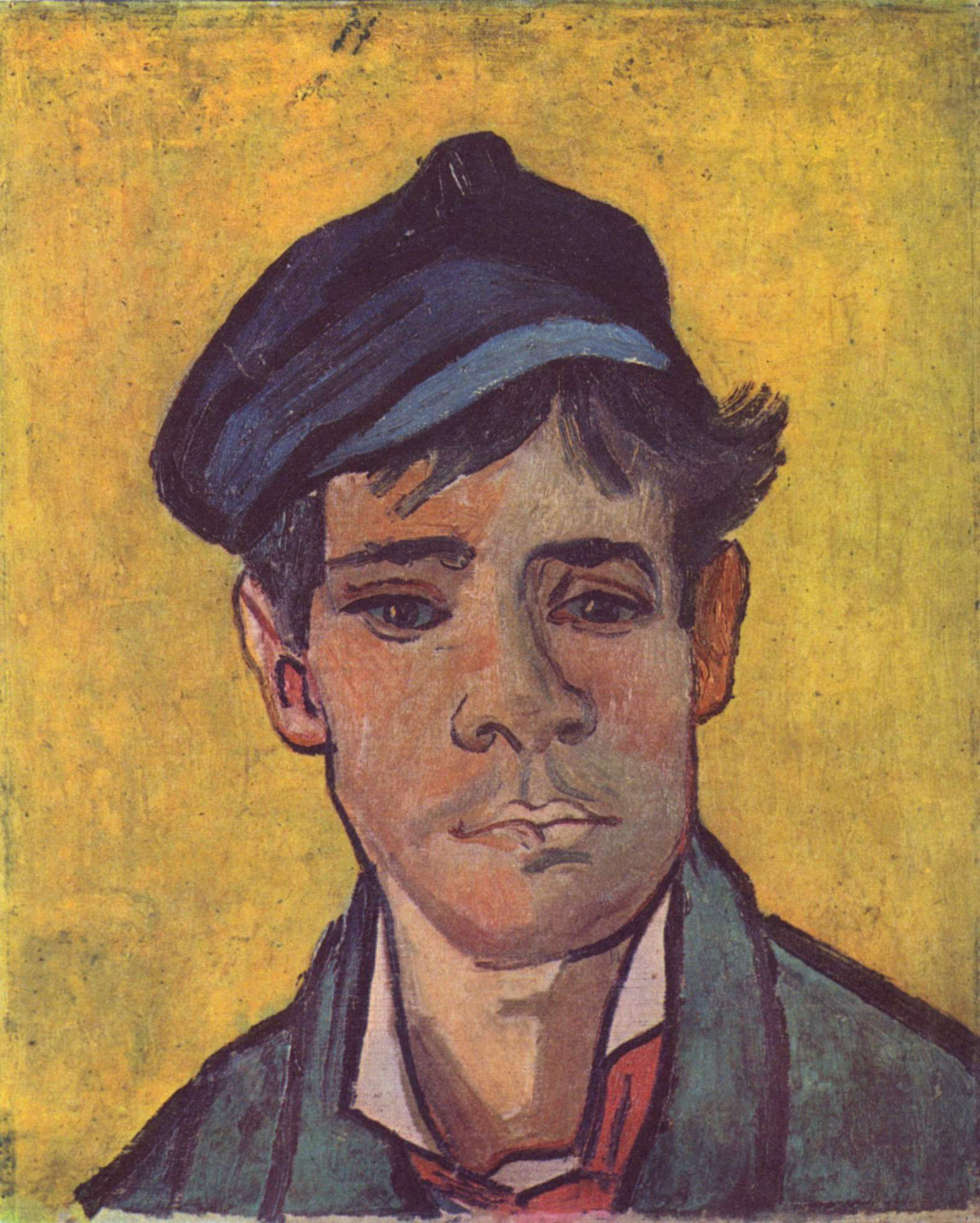
Young Man with a Cap (Armand Roulin), 1888, Private Collection, Zürich, Switzerland (F536)

==== Camille ====
Camille Roulin, the middle child, was born in Lambesc in southern France, on 10 July 1877, and died on 4 June 1922. When his portrait was painted, Camille was eleven years of age. The Van Gogh Museum painting shows Camille's head and shoulders. Yellow brush strokes behind him are evocative of the sun.

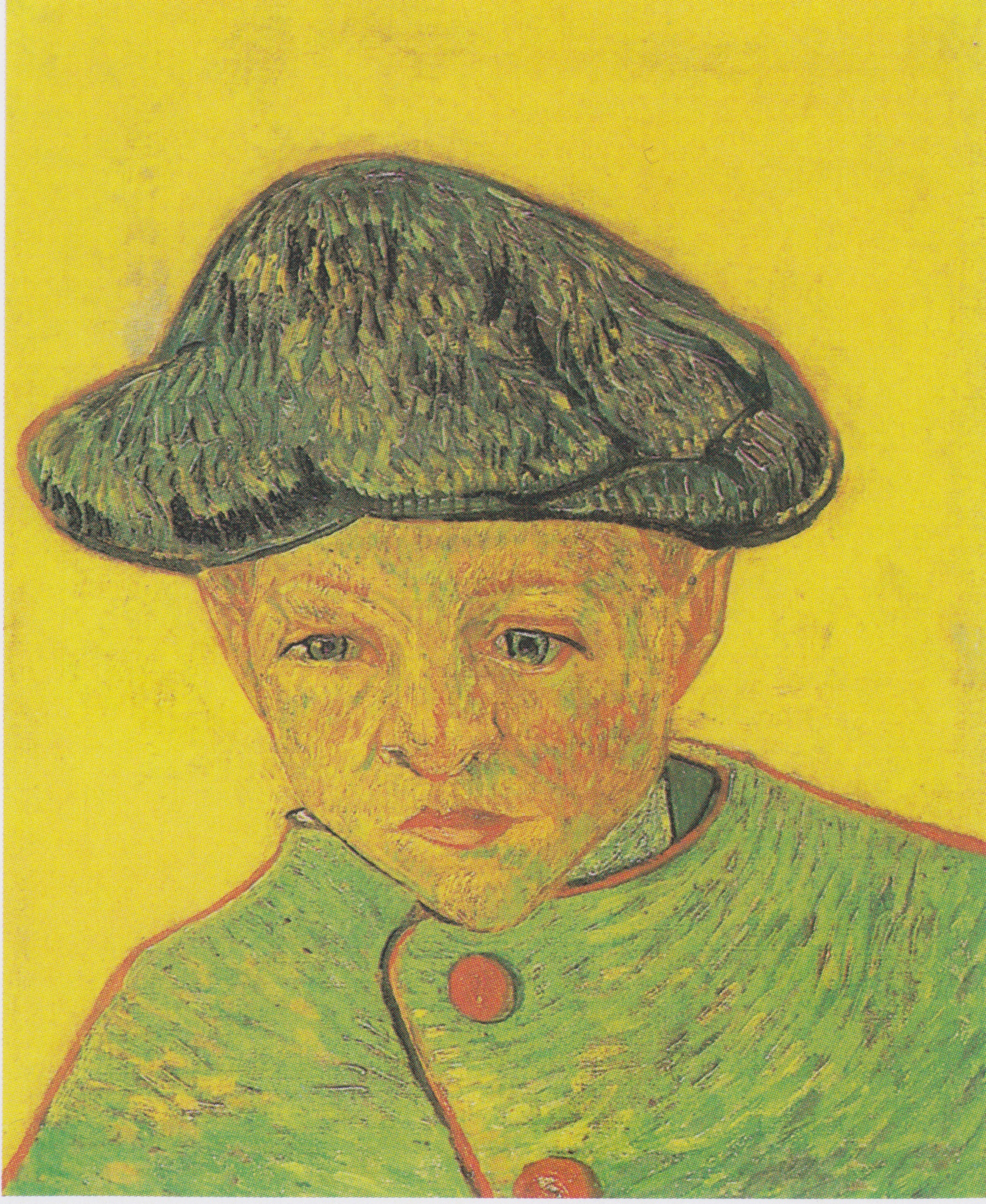
Portrait of Camille Roulin, 1888, Oil on Canvas, Philadelphia Museum of Art, Philadelphia, Pennsylvania (F537).

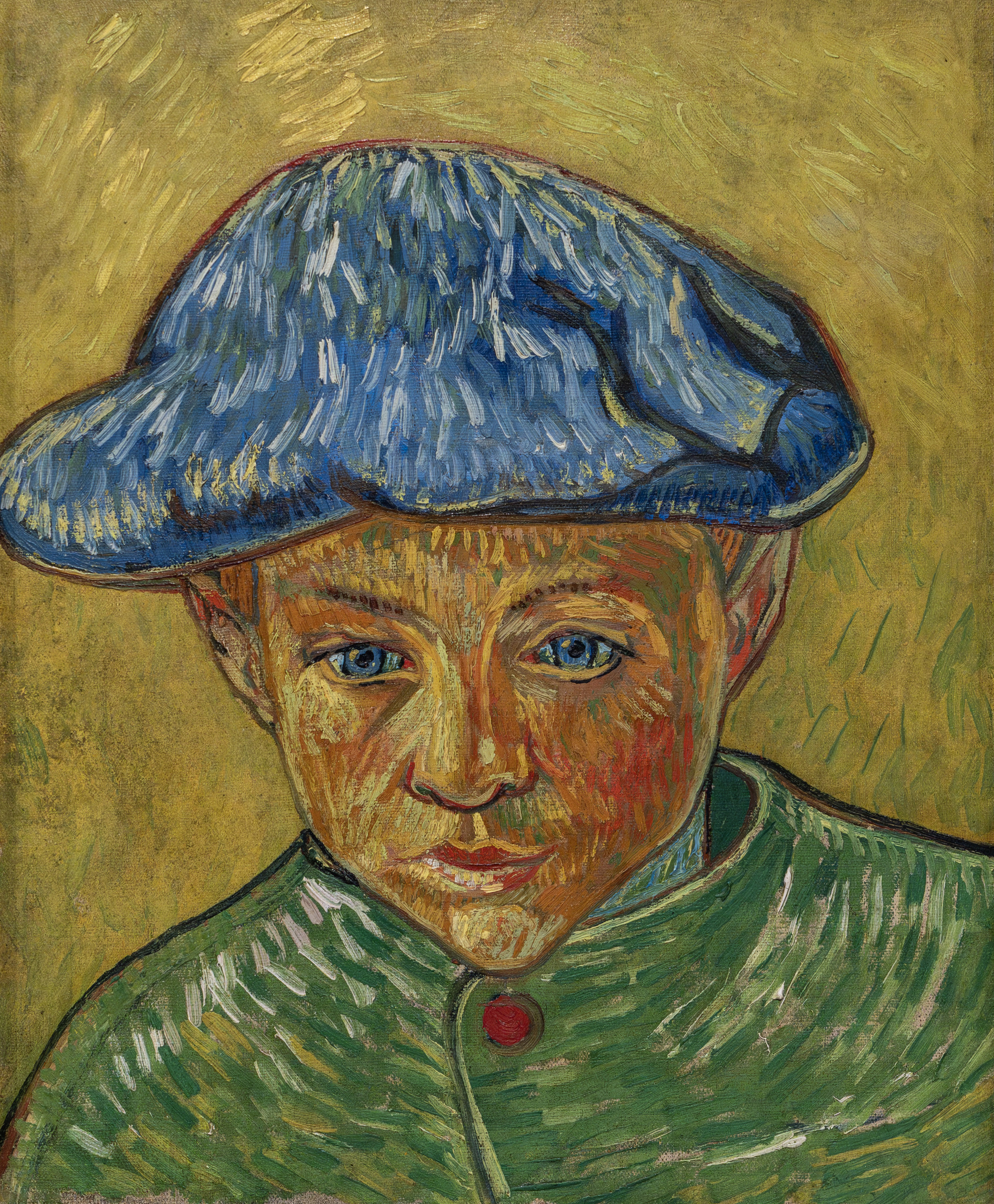
Portrait of Camille Roulin, 1888, Oil on Canvas, 40.5 X 32.5 cm, Van Gogh Museum, Amsterdam, Netherlands (F538)

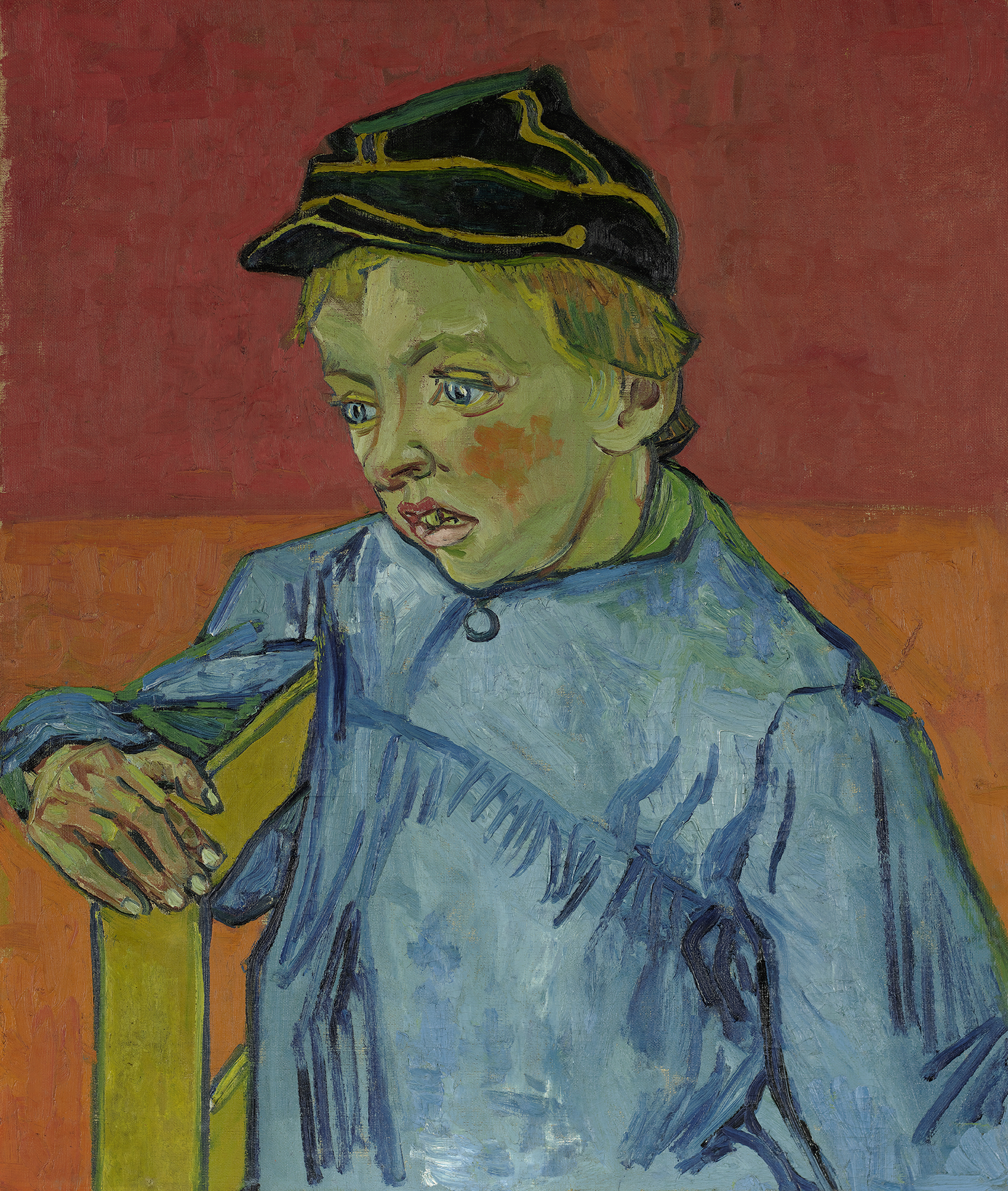
The Schoolboy with Uniform Cap (Camille Roulin), early December 1888, Museu de Arte de São Paulo, São Paulo, Brazil (F665)

==== Marcelle ====
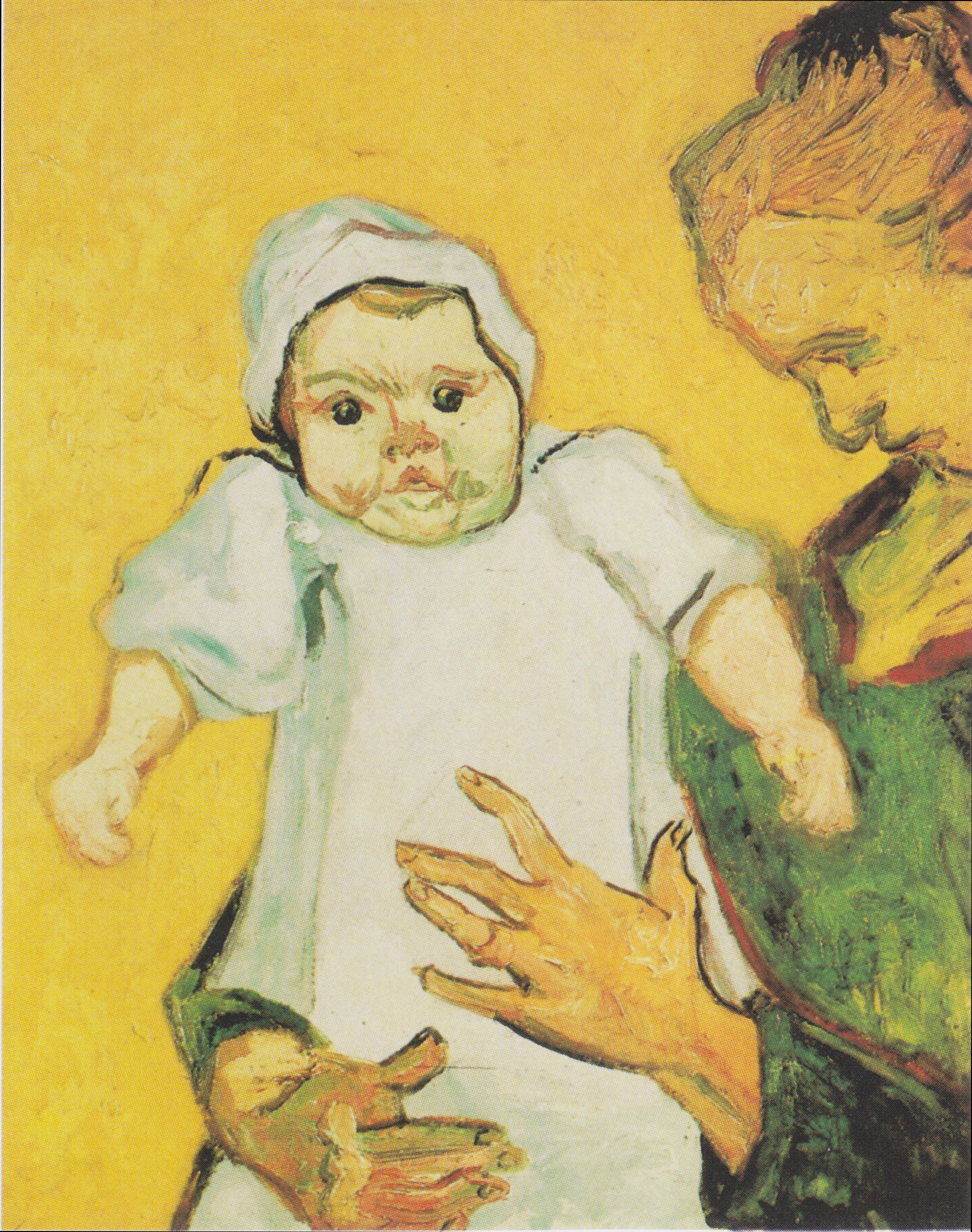
Mother Roulin with Her Baby, 1888, The Metropolitan Museum of Art, New York (F491)

Marcelle Roulin, the youngest child, was born on 31 July 1888, and four months old, when Van Gogh made her portraits. She was painted three times by herself and twice on her mother's lap.

Madame Roulin's husband, the postman, was good friends with Vincent van Gogh while they were both in Arles. The portrait of Madame Roulin and her baby was painted through November and December 1888.

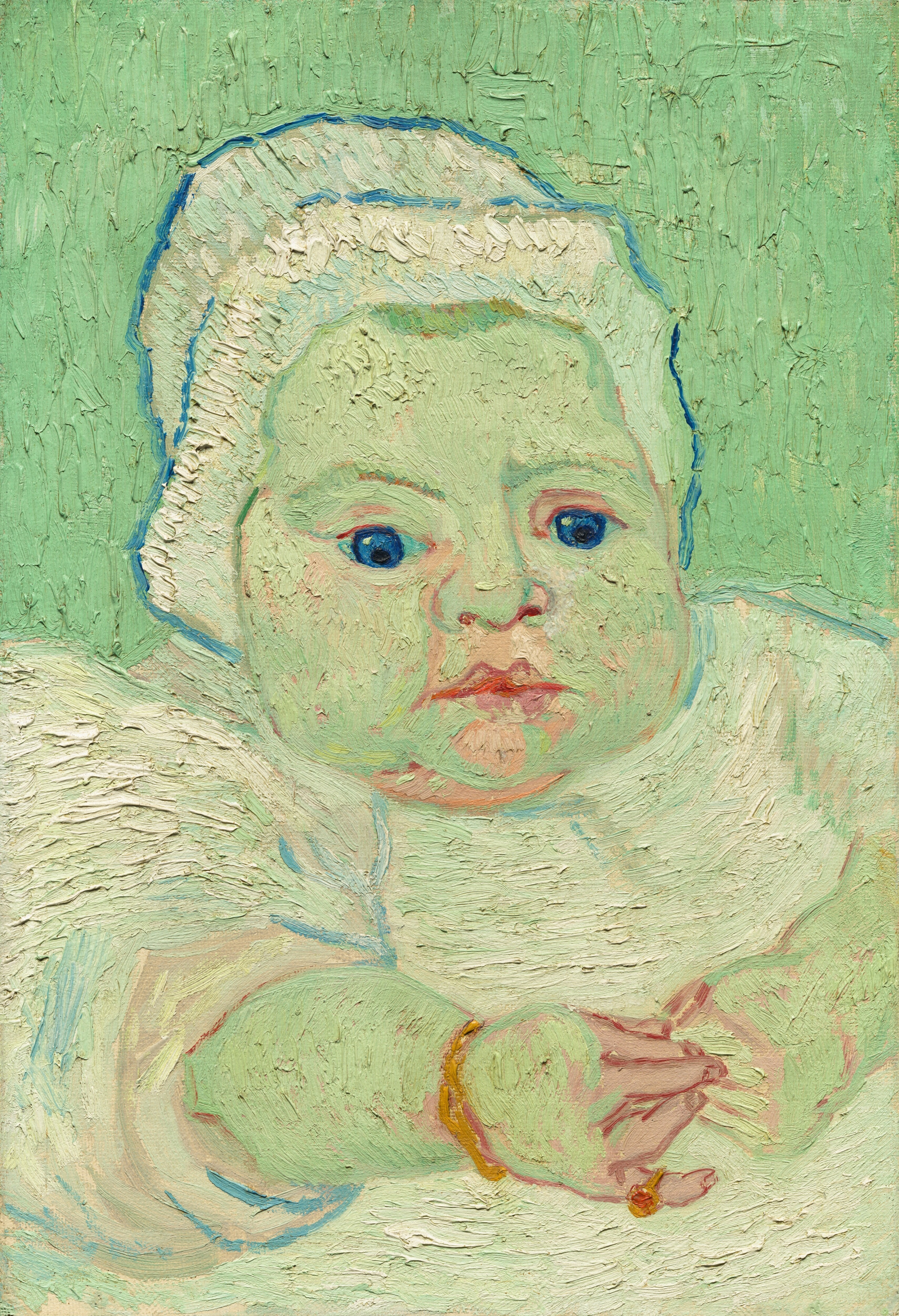
Roulin's Baby, 1888, Oil on Canvas, National Gallery of Art, Washington, D.C. (F440)

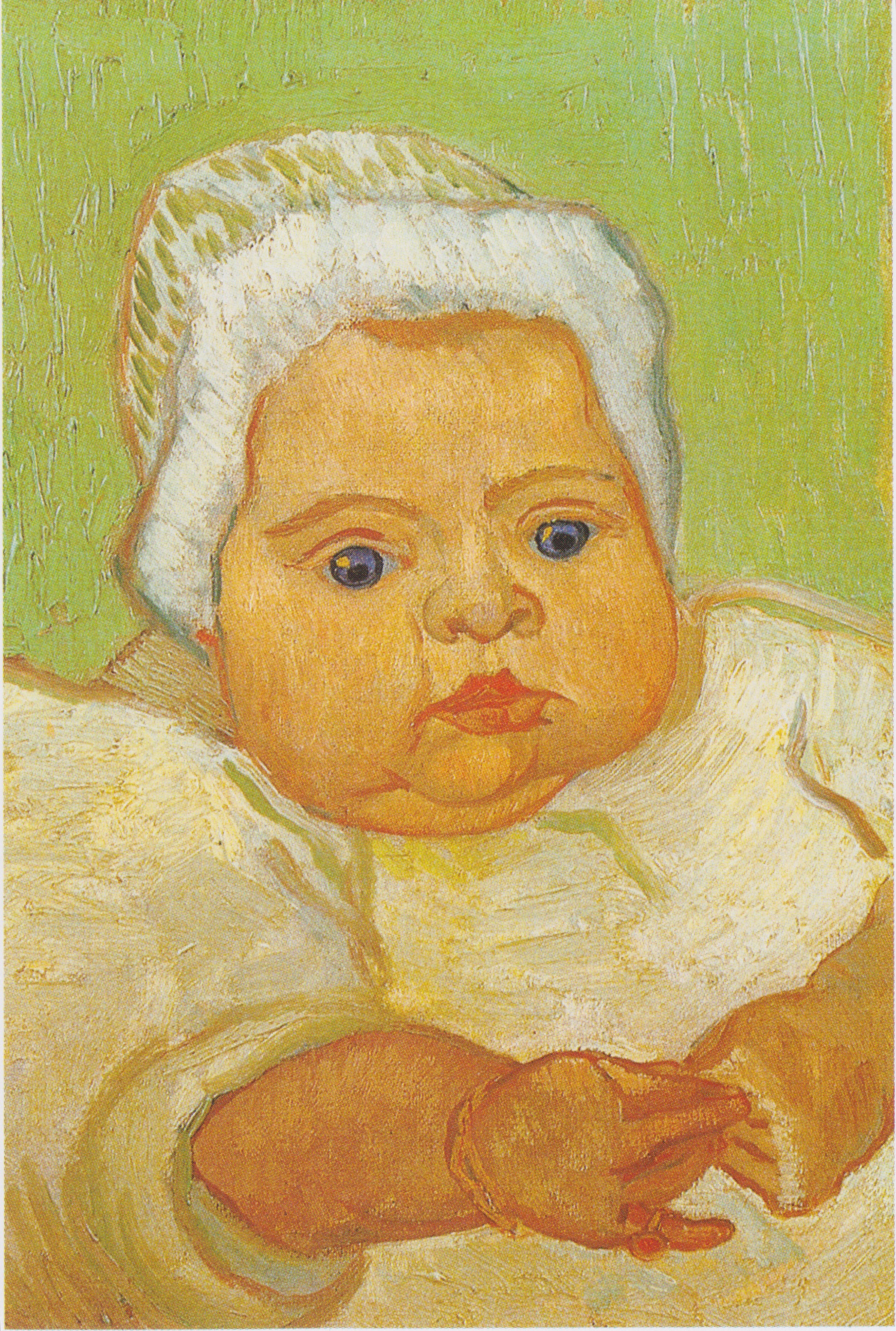
Portrait of Marcelle Roulin, 1888, Oil on Canvas, 35 X 24.5 cm, Van Gogh Museum, Amsterdam, Netherlands (F441)

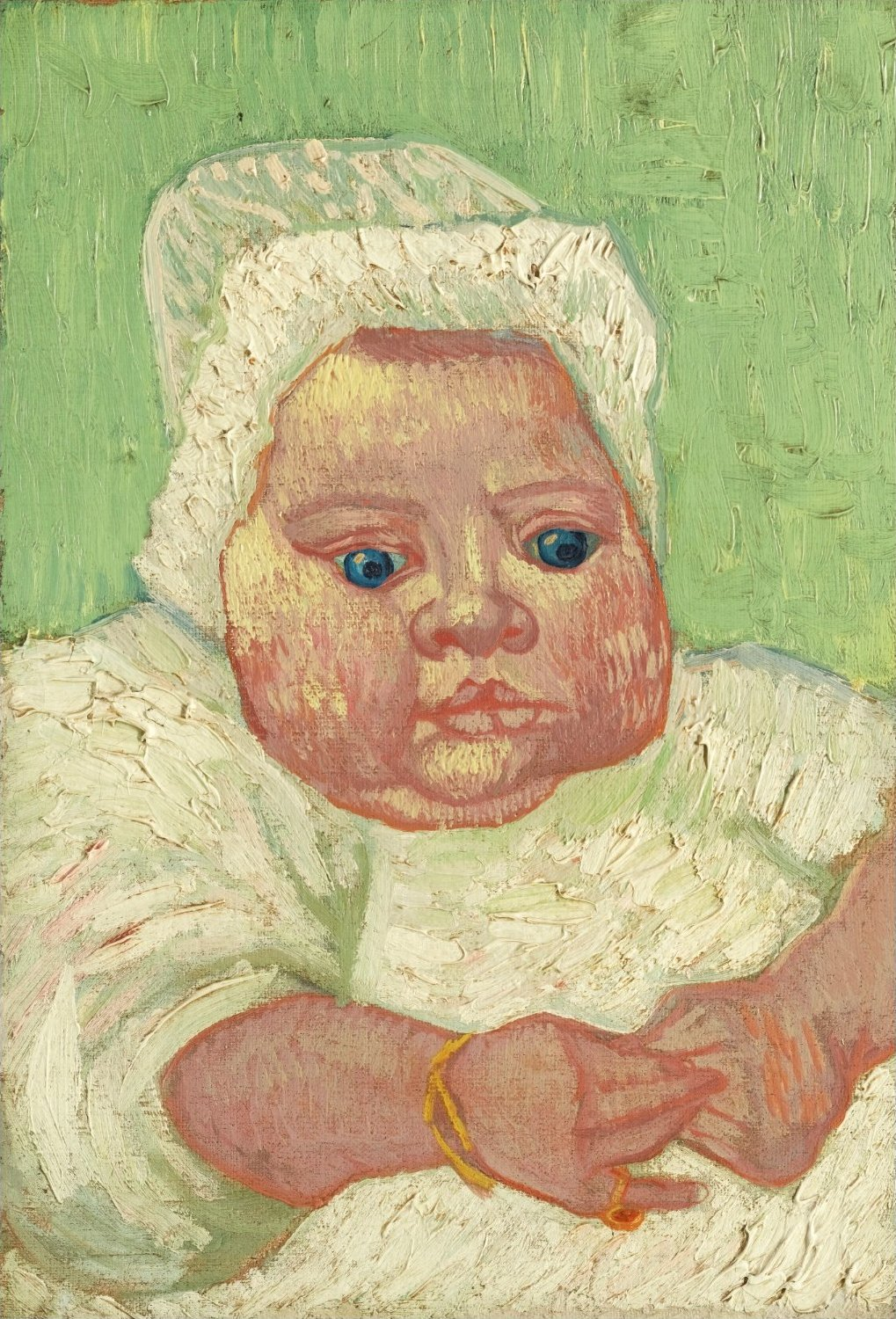
Portrait of Marcelle Roulin, 1888, Oil on Canvas, Fondation Socindec, Vaduz, Liechtenstein (F441a)

=== Vieux Paysan: Patience Escalier ===
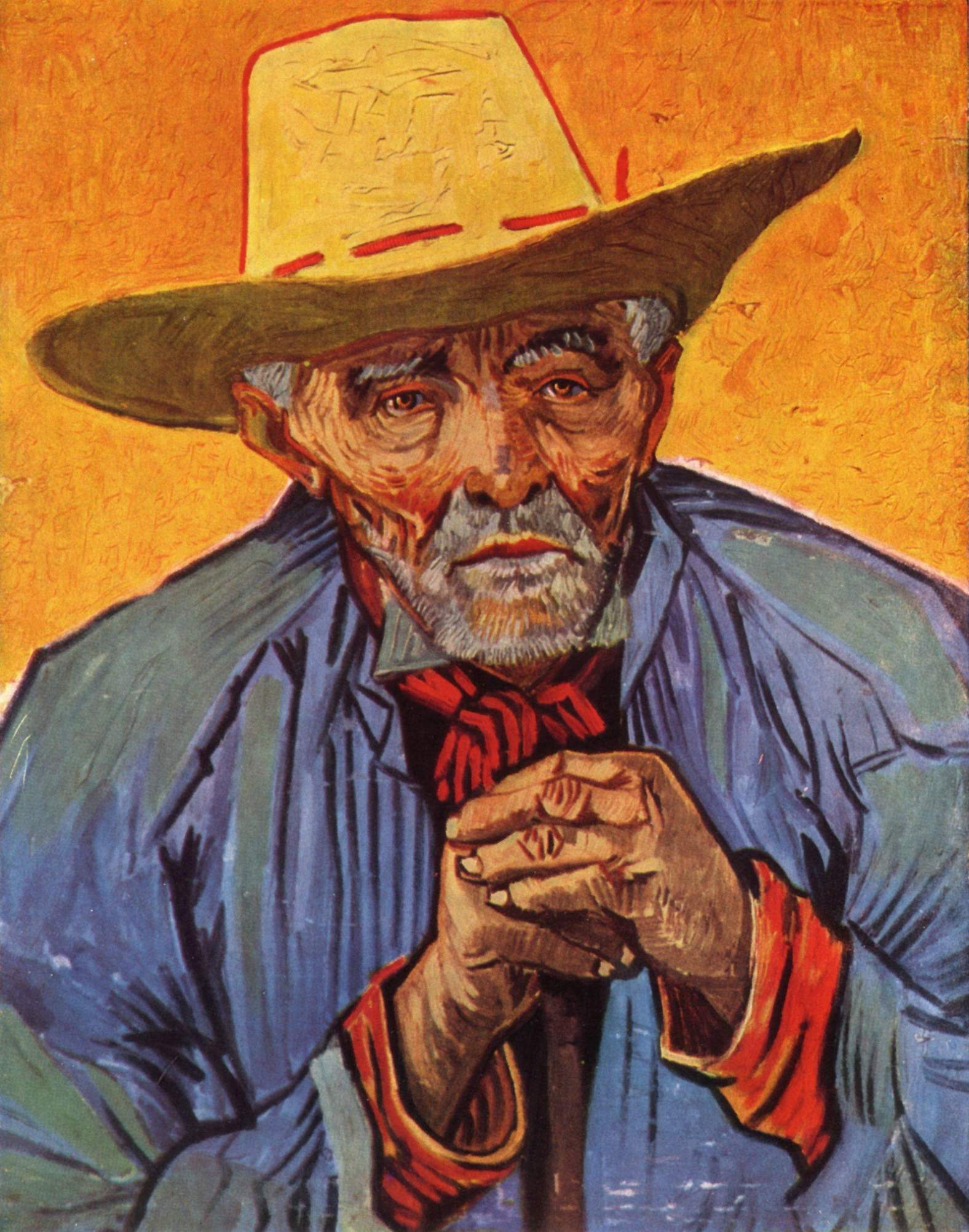
Patience Escalier, second version, end August 1888, Oil on canvas, 69 x 56 cm, Private collection (F444)

Patience Escalier was a gardener and a shephard by trade, and his portrait the result of Van Gogh's desire to paint an older peasant who resembled his father in features.

There are two versions of this portrait. One held by the Norton Simon Museum in Pasadena, California, and the other in the private collection of Philip Niarchos.

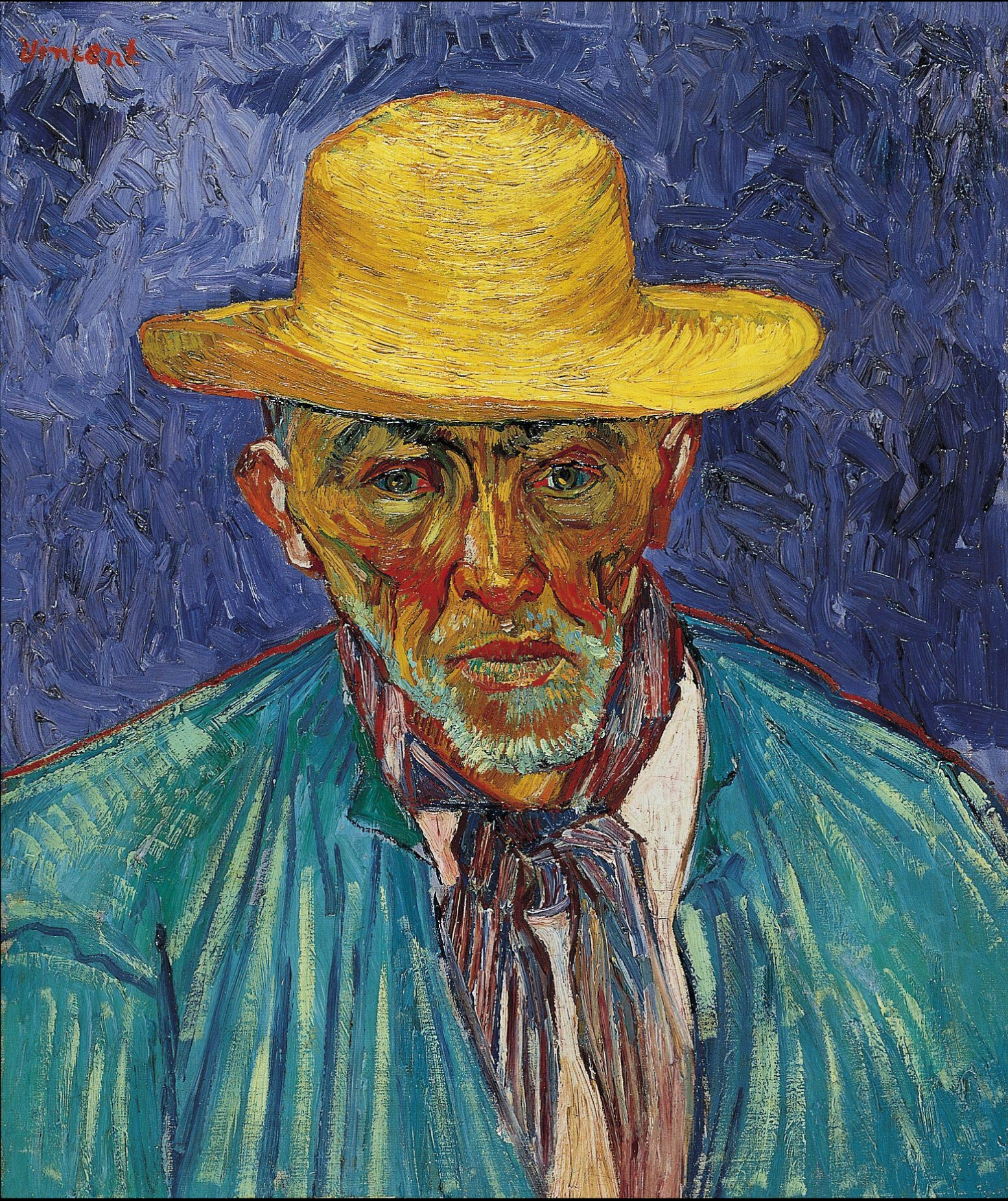
Portrait of a Peasant (Patience Escalier), first version, August 1888, oil on canvas, 64.1 x 54.6 cm, Norton Simon Museum (F443)

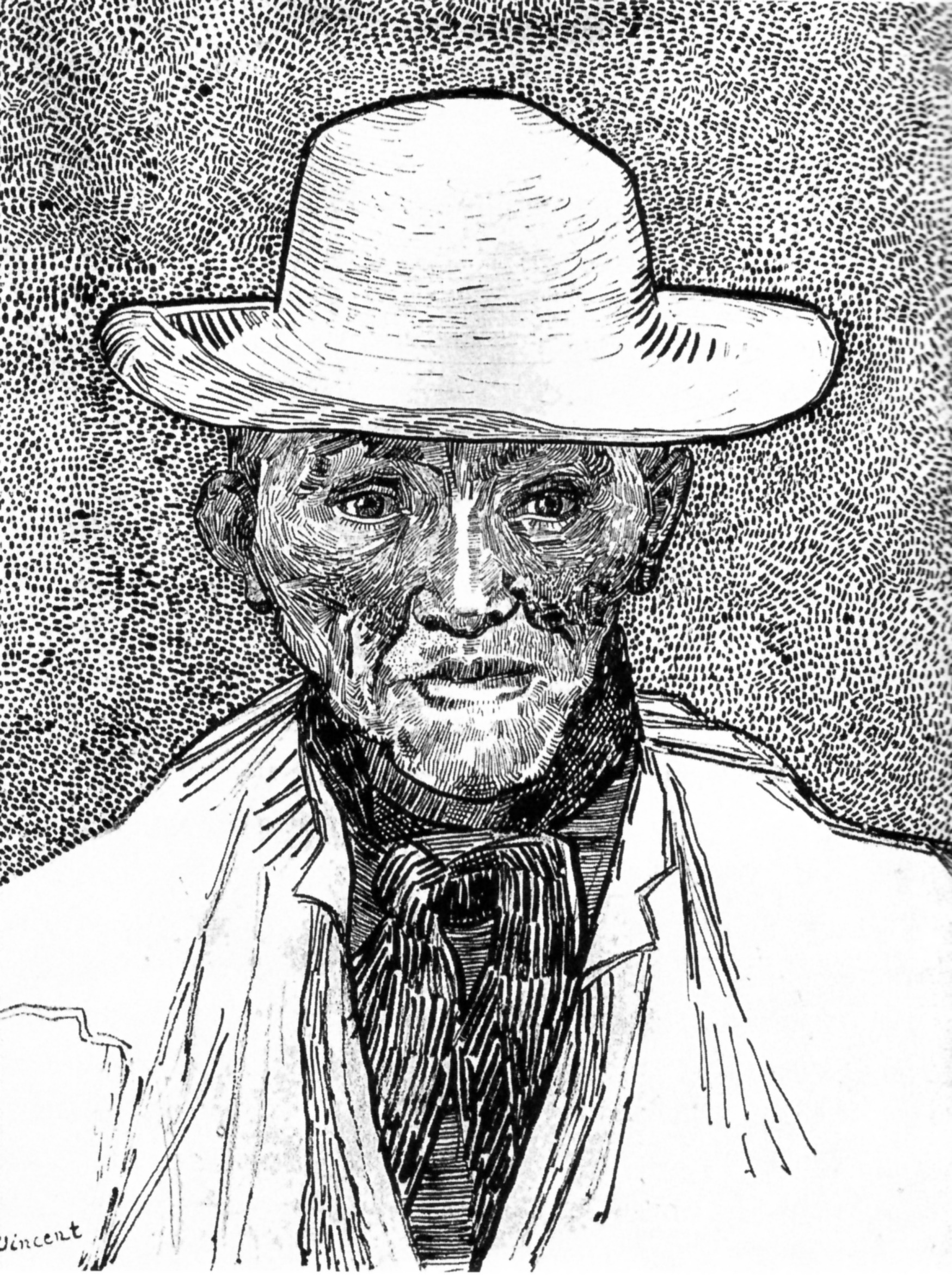
Old Peasant (Patience Escalier), Drawing in pen and ink, September 1888, Fogg Art Museum, Cambridge, MA (F1460)

== Saint-Rémy-en-Provence (1889–1890) ==
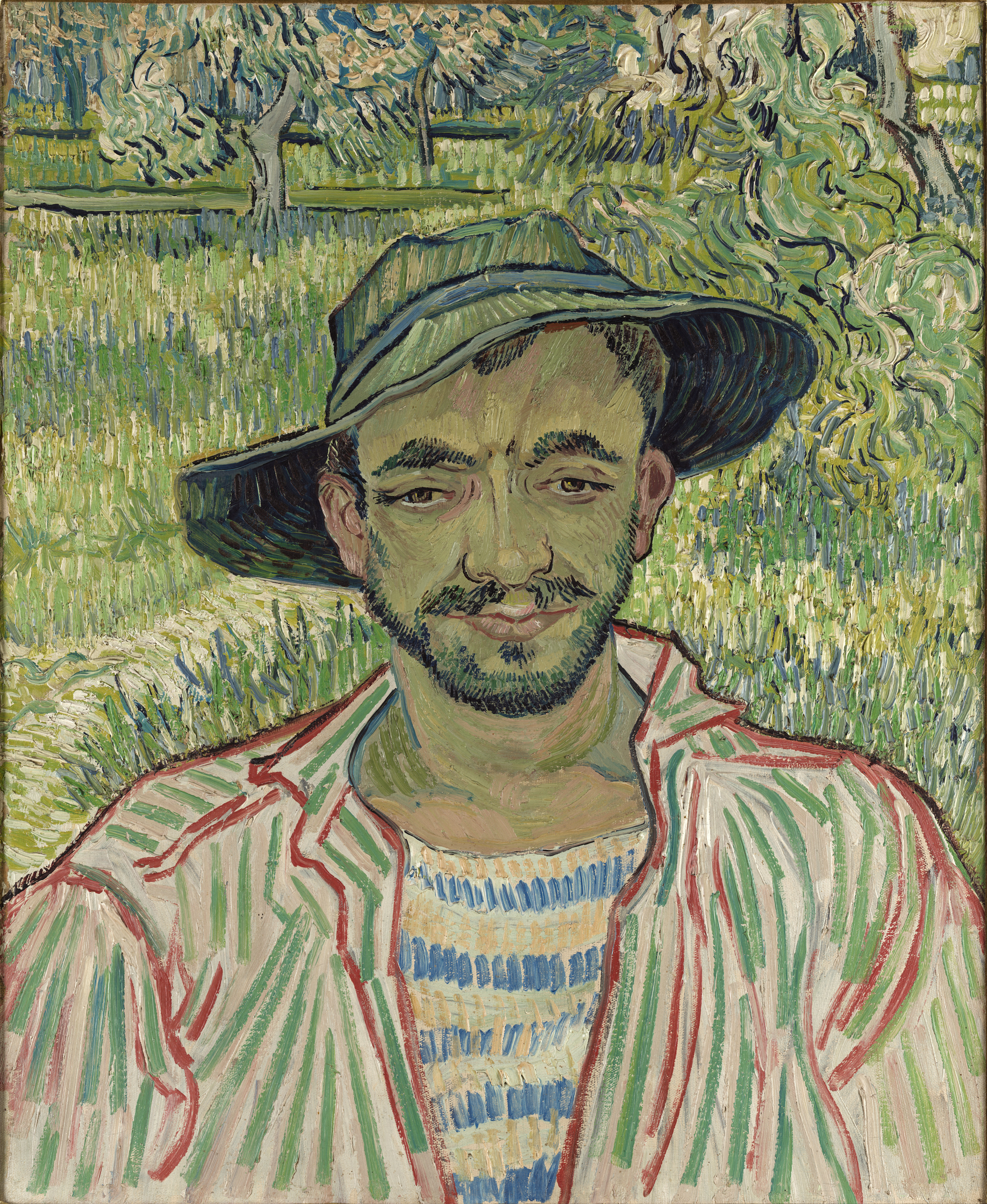
Garçon

=== The Trabuc Family ===
François Trabuc, who was the chief orderly at Saint-Paul, and his wife, Jeanne both sat for van Gogh. François Trabuc had a look of "contemplative calm" which van Gogh found interesting in spite of the misery he had witness at Saint-Paul and a Marseilles hospital during outbreaks of cholera. He wrote to Theo of Trabuc's character, a military presence and "small keen black eyes". If it were not for his intelligence and kindness, his eyes could seem like that of a bird of prey.

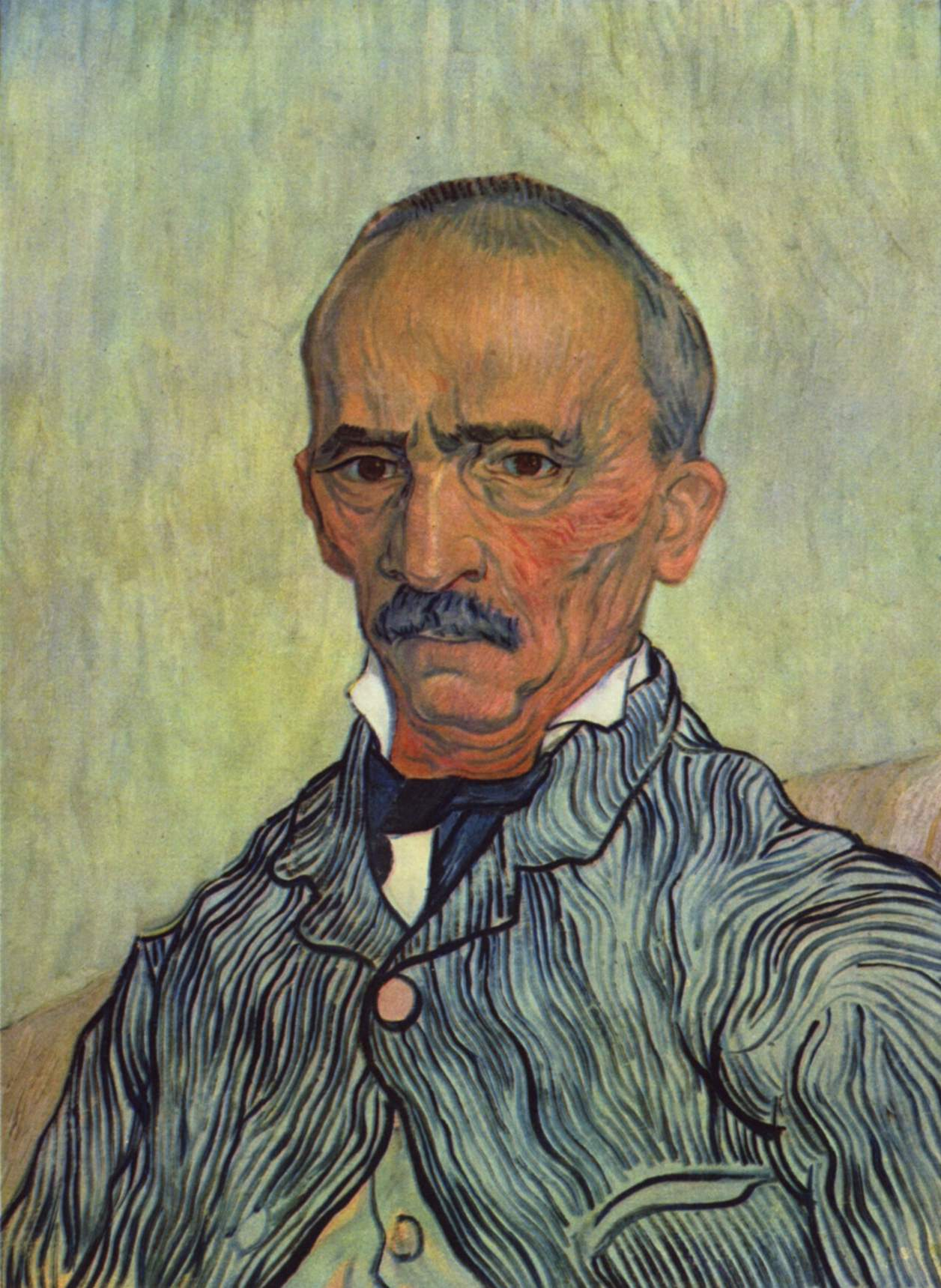
François Trabuc

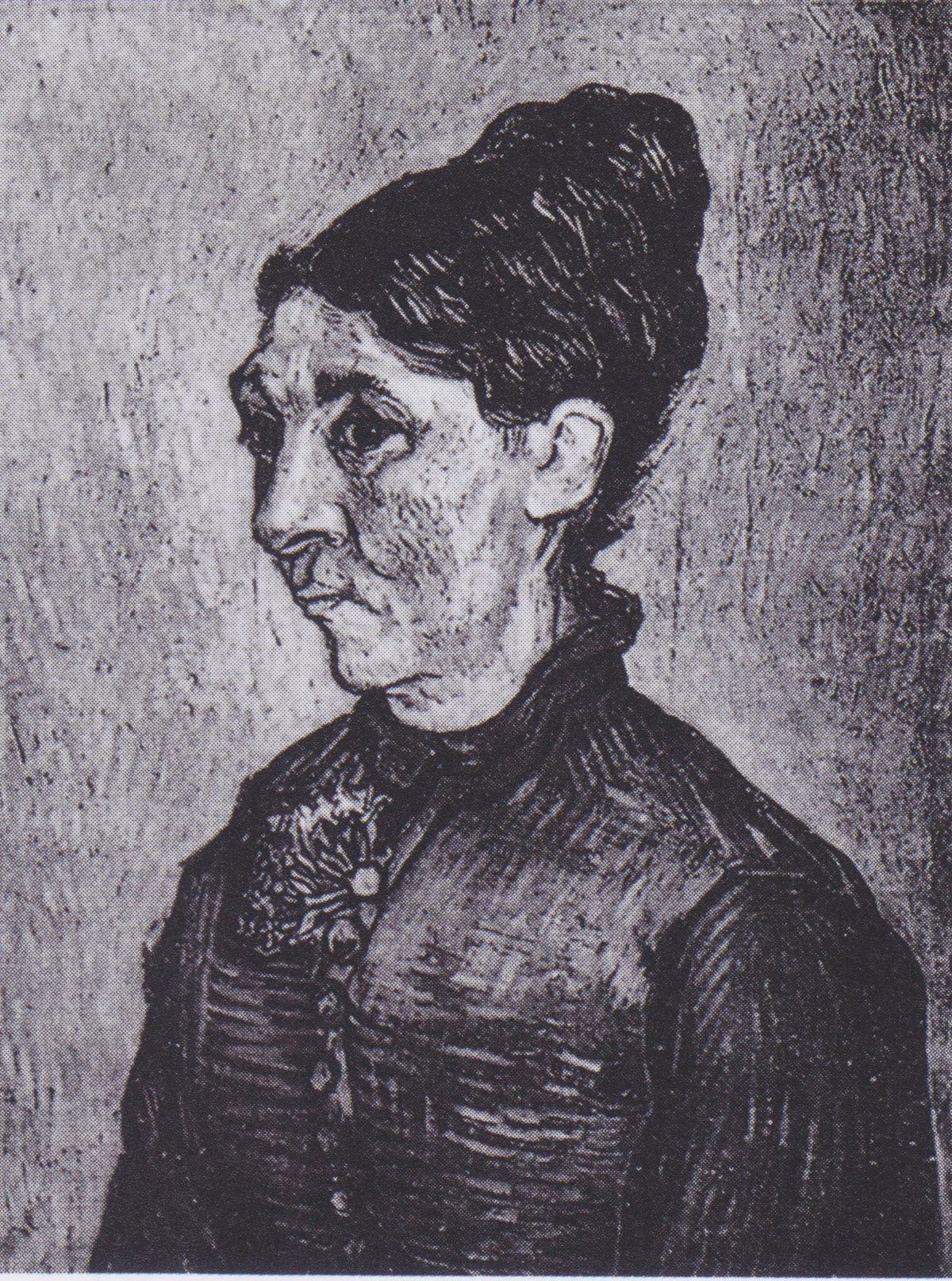
Jeanne Trabuc (b/w copy)

=== Portrait of a Patient ===
While in Saint-Paul, Van Gogh wrote of other patients and their support for one another, "Though here there are some patients very seriously ill, the fear and horror of madness that I used to have has already lessened a great deal. And though here you continually hear terrible cries and howls like beasts in a menagerie, in spite of that people get to know each other very well and help each other when their attacks come on."

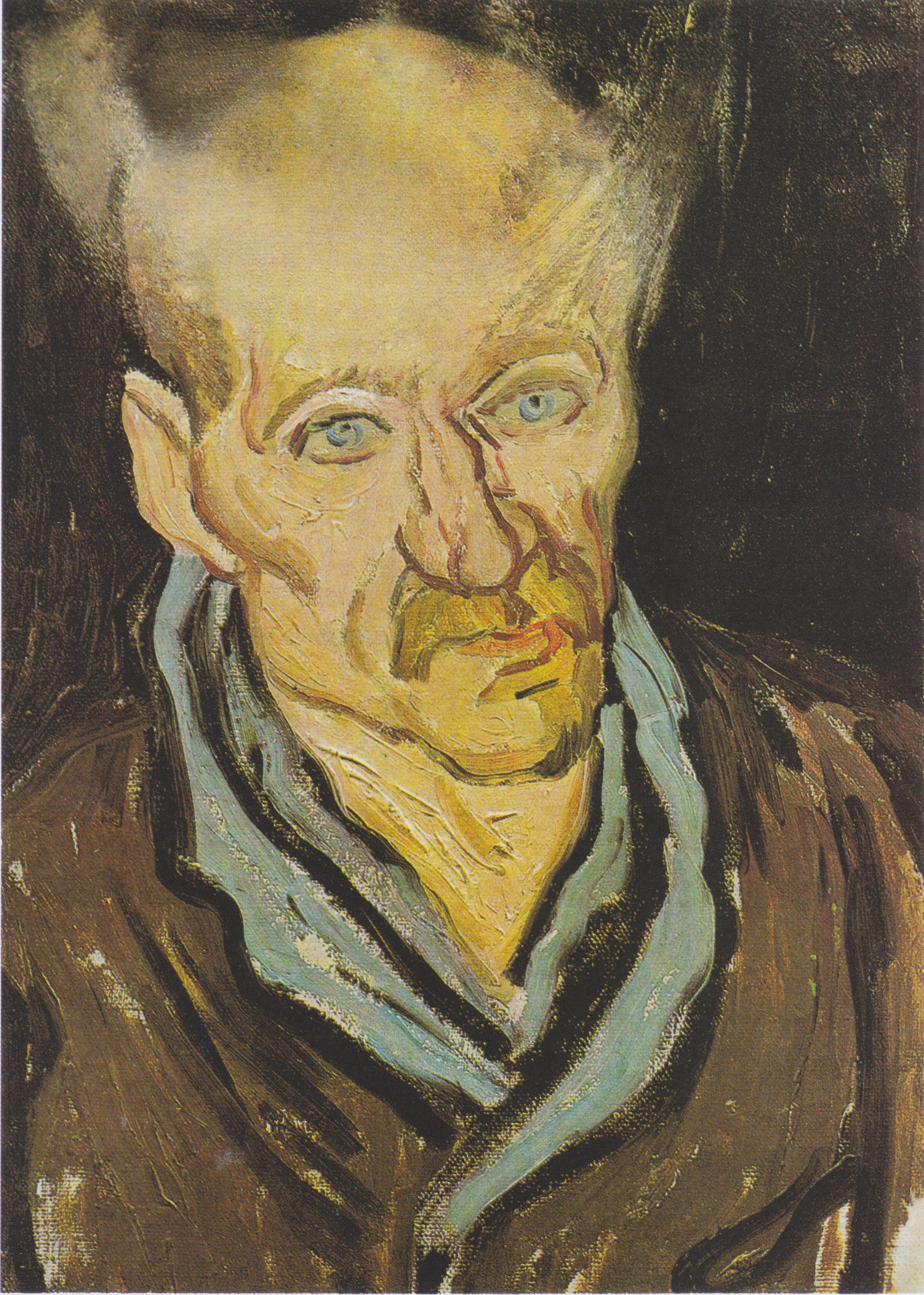
Portrait of a Patient in Saint-Paul

== Auvers-sur-Oise (1890) ==
=== The Gachet Family ===
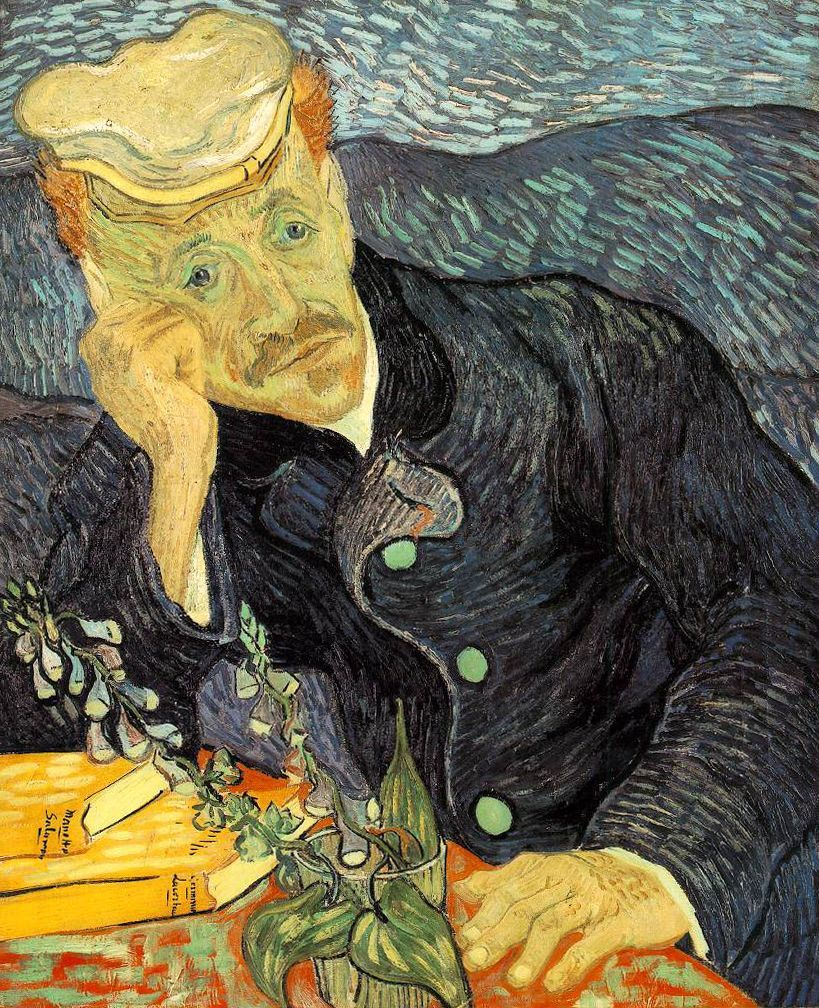
Doctor Gachet, first version, Private collection

Portrait of Dr. Gachet is one of the most famous paintings by Dutch artist Vincent van Gogh of Dr. Paul Gachet, who cared for the artist in his last months. In 1990, it fetched a record price at auction, selling for $82.5 million ($75 million, plus a 10 percent buyer's commission).

Dr. Gachet was an amateur painter and engraver. Vincent van Gogh went to the doctor for medical care. Van Gogh saw himself in the doctor; like himself, he saw in Dr. Gachet “the heart-broken expression of our time.” Similar to many of van Gogh's portraits, the painting is a study not of the physical features of the man, but of the inner qualities of the doctor's personality.

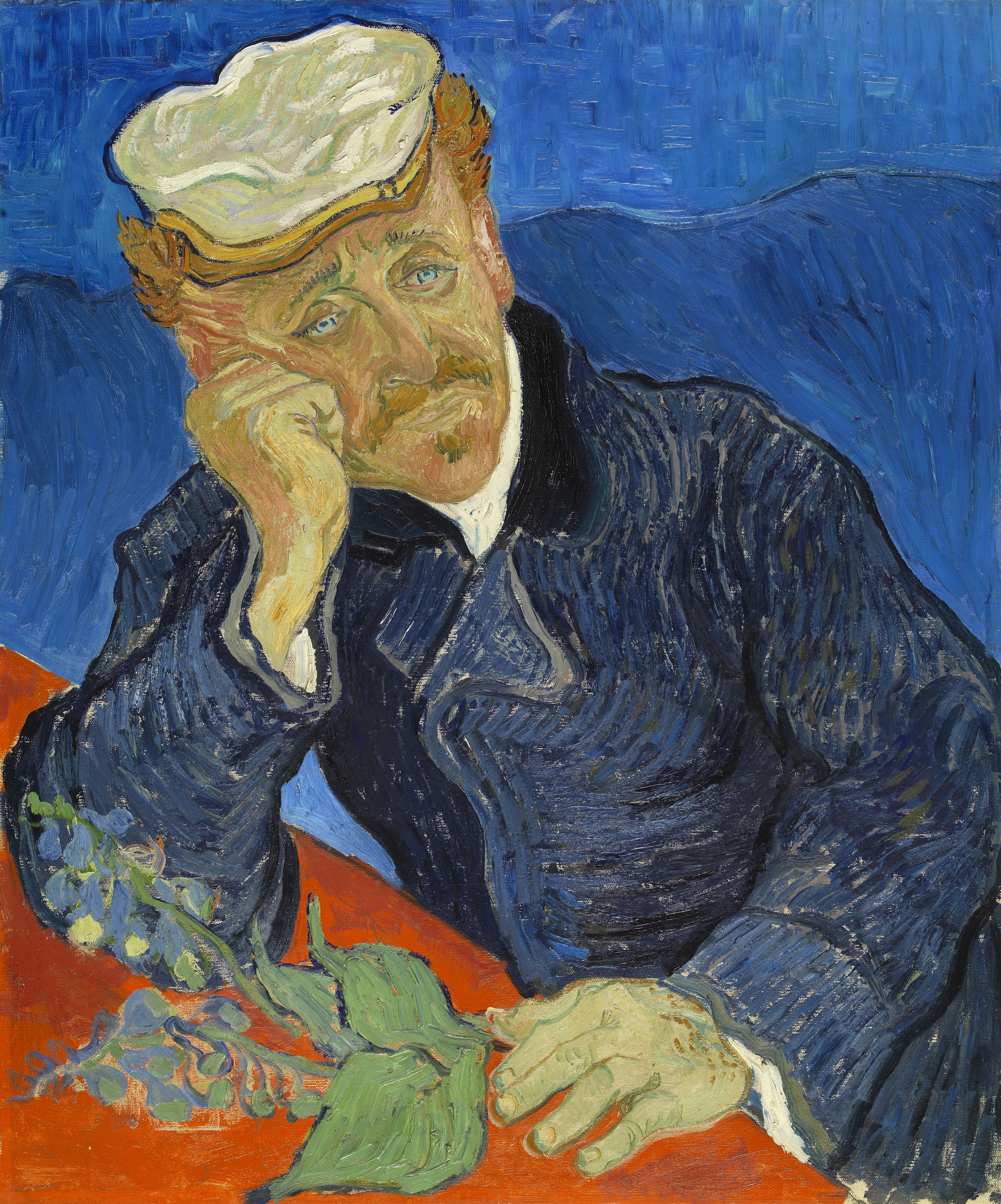
Paul-Ferdinand Gachet, 1890
Oil on canvas, 68 x 57 cm
Musée d'Orsay, Paris

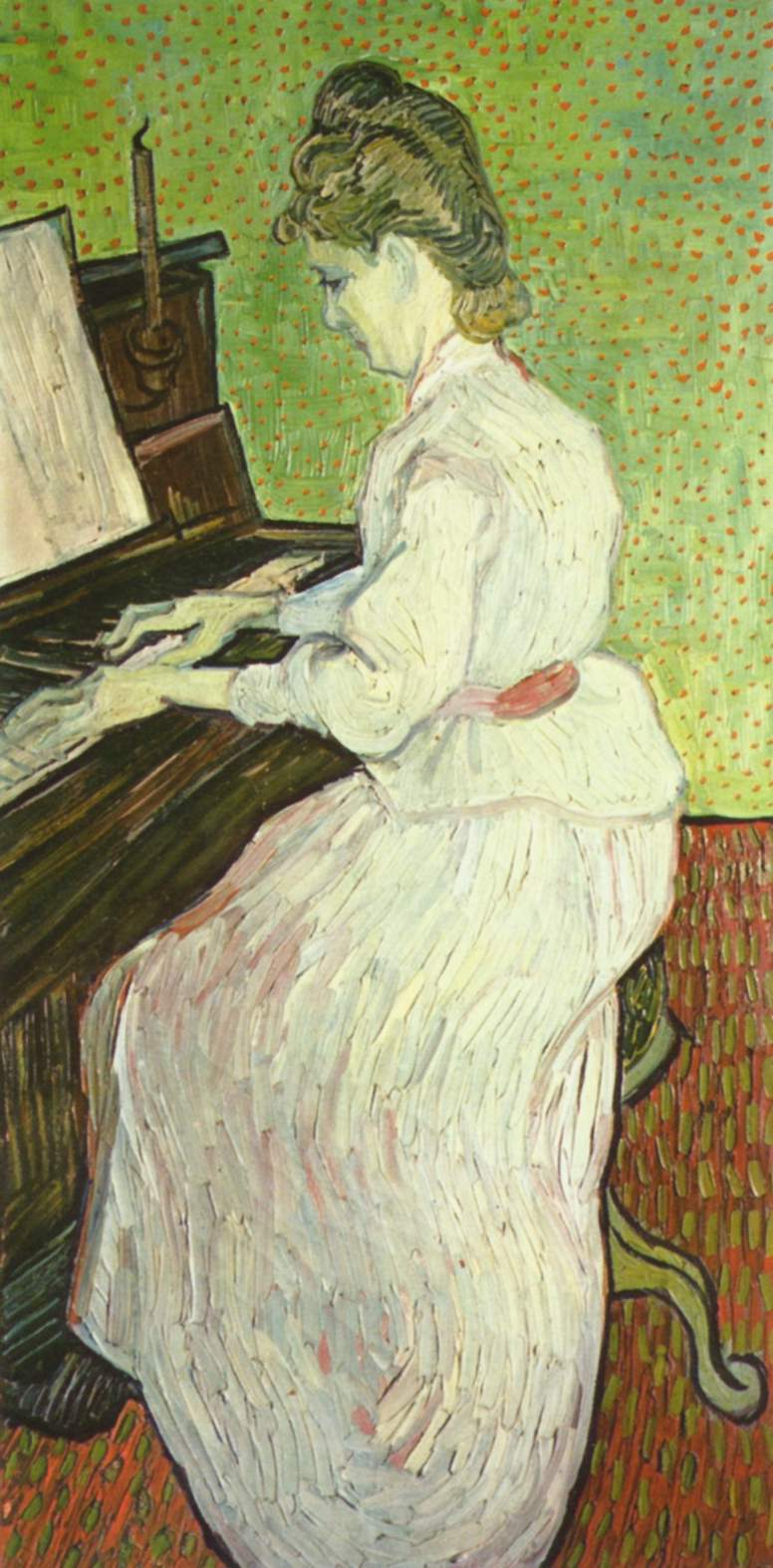
Marguerite Gachet, 1890
Oil on canvas, 102 x 50 cm
Kunstmuseum, Basel

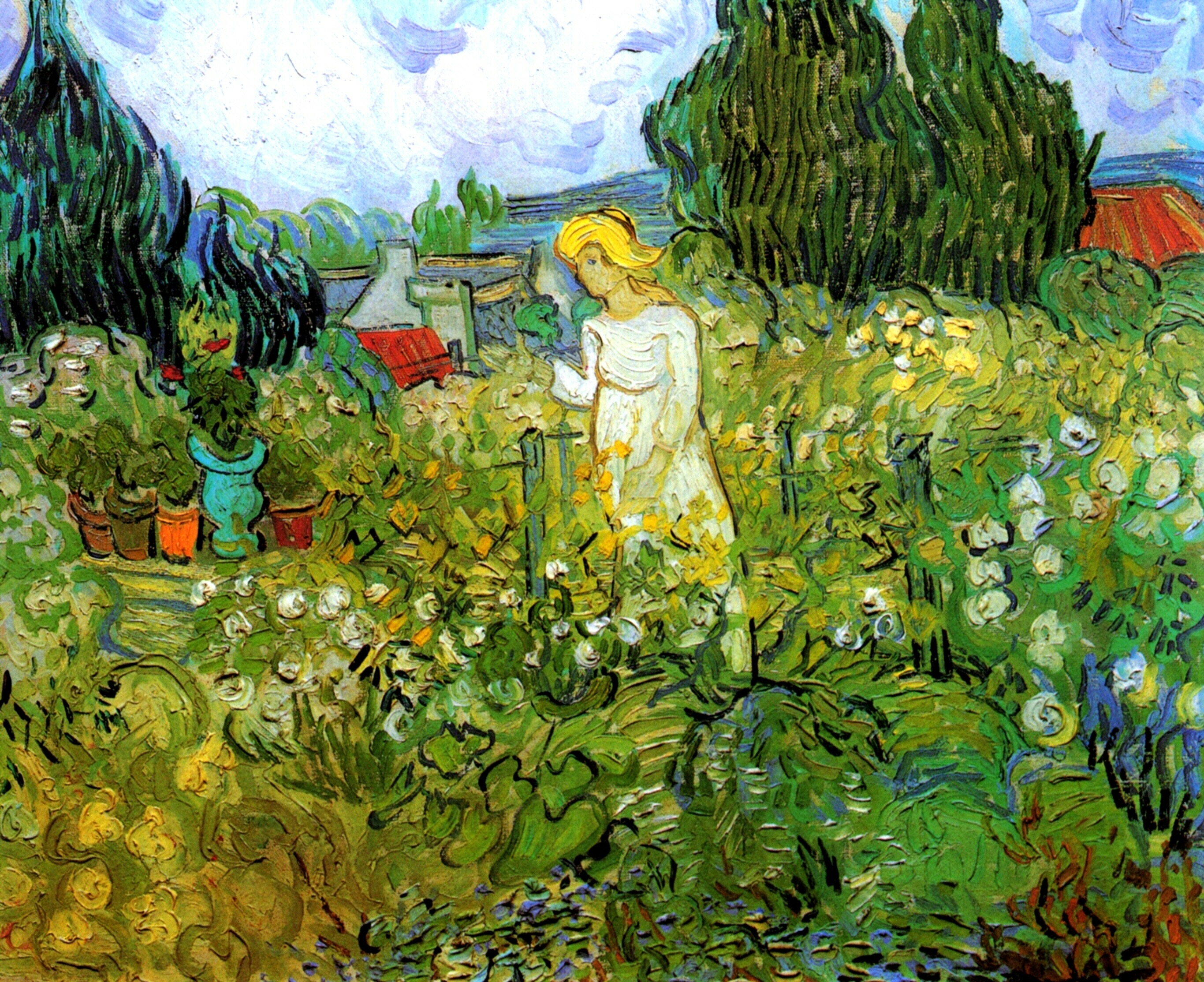
Marguerite Gachet in the Garden 1890 Musée d'Orsay, Paris, France (F756)

=== Adeline Ravoux ===
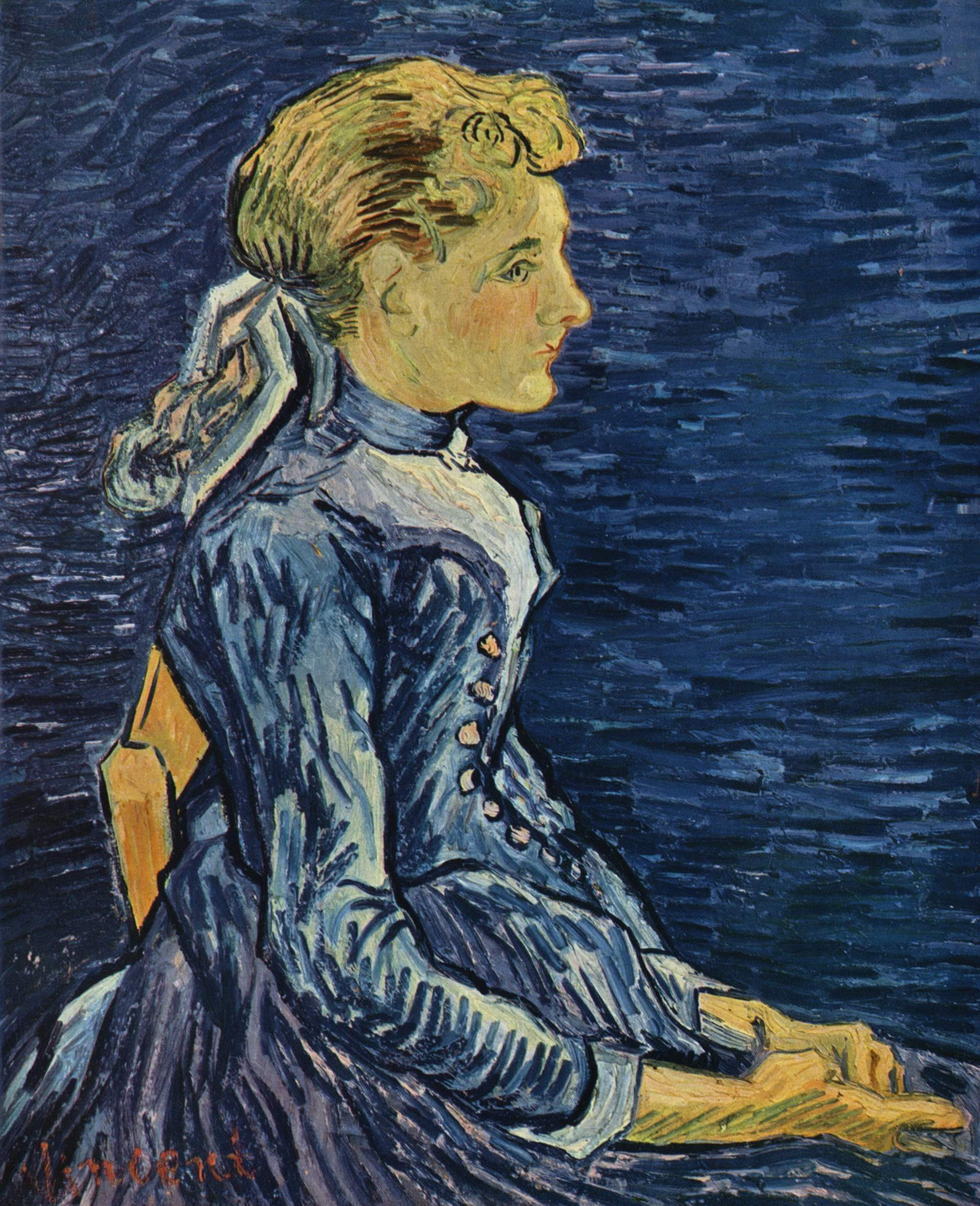
Portrait of Adeline Ravoux (Half-Figure) 1890 Private Collection (F768)

Portrait of Adeline Ravoux was painted by Vincent van Gogh in 1890.

The twelve-year-old Adeline Ravoux was the daughter of Arthur-Gustave Ravoux, whose inn is where Van Gogh lodged in Auvers-sur-Oise. She later wrote a memoir of Van Gogh's stay with them. She witnessed Van Gogh's return to the inn after the fatal incident where he shot himself: "Vincent walked bent, holding his stomach, again exaggerating his habit of holding one shoulder higher than the other. Mother asked him: " M. Vincent, we were anxious, we are happy to see you to return; have you had a problem?" He replied in a suffering voice: "No, but I have…" he did not finish, crossed the hall, took the staircase and climbed to his bedroom. I was witness to this scene. Vincent made on us such a strange impression that Father got up and went to the staircase to see if he could hear anything." See also Paintings of Children (Van Gogh series).

A sheet of figure studies F1652r has at its upper left the profile of a young girl recognizably Adeline Ravoux. The young girl seen from behind to the left is assumed to be her as well. She is thought to appear in a number of other paintings, including especially F819 Two Ladies Walking in a Landscape. The sheet fetched $480,000 at a Christie's sale in 2007.

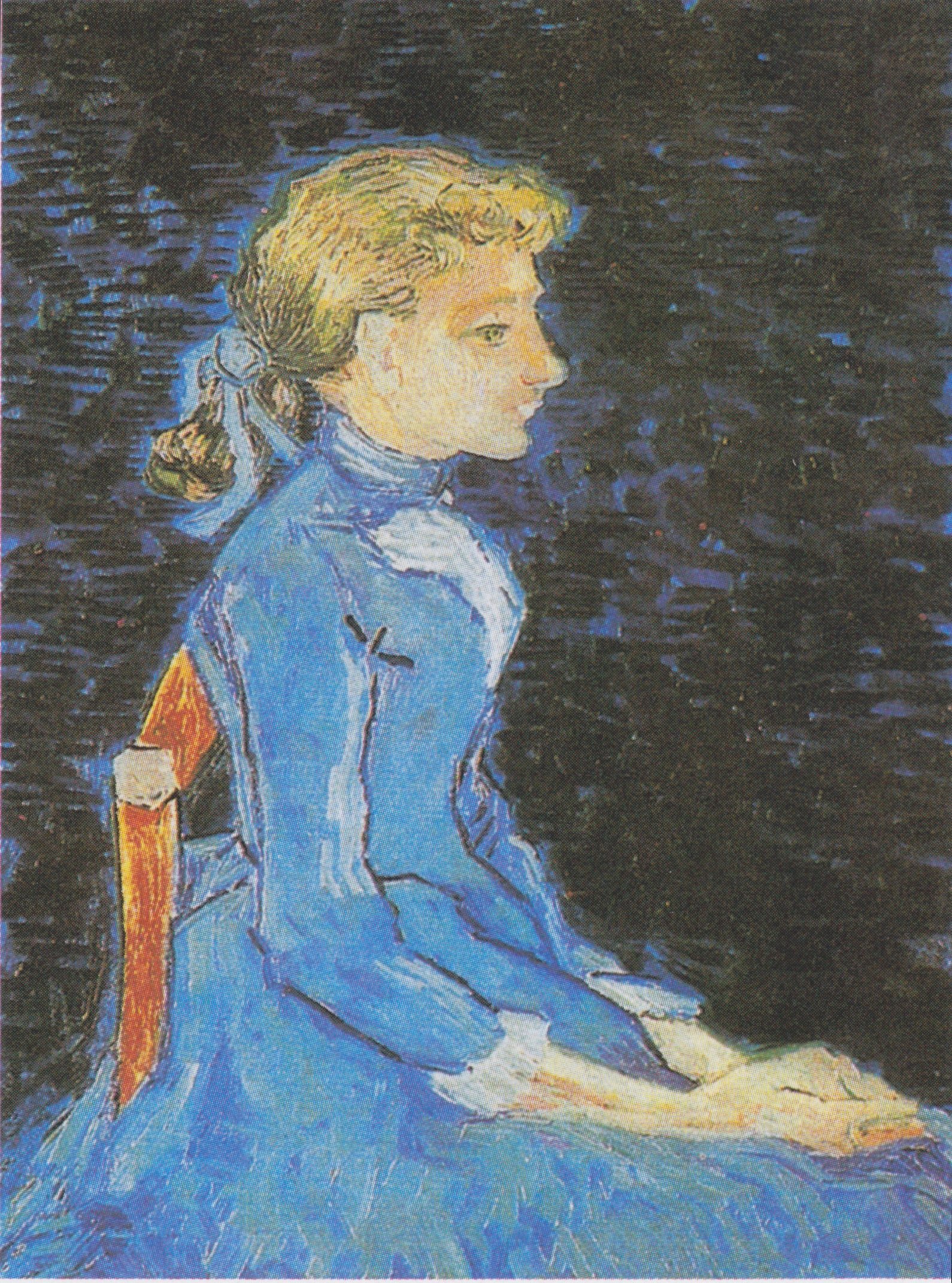
Portrait of Adeline Ravoux
June 1890
Private collection (F769)

Portrait of Adeline Ravoux
June 1890
Cleveland Museum of Art, Cleveland, Ohio (F768)

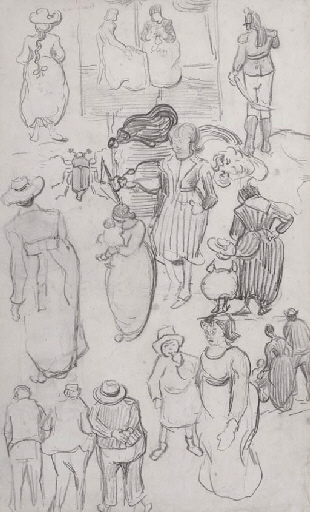
Sheet with Many Sketches of Figures
July 1890
Private collection (F1652r)

=== Child with Orange ===
See also Paintings of Children (Van Gogh series).

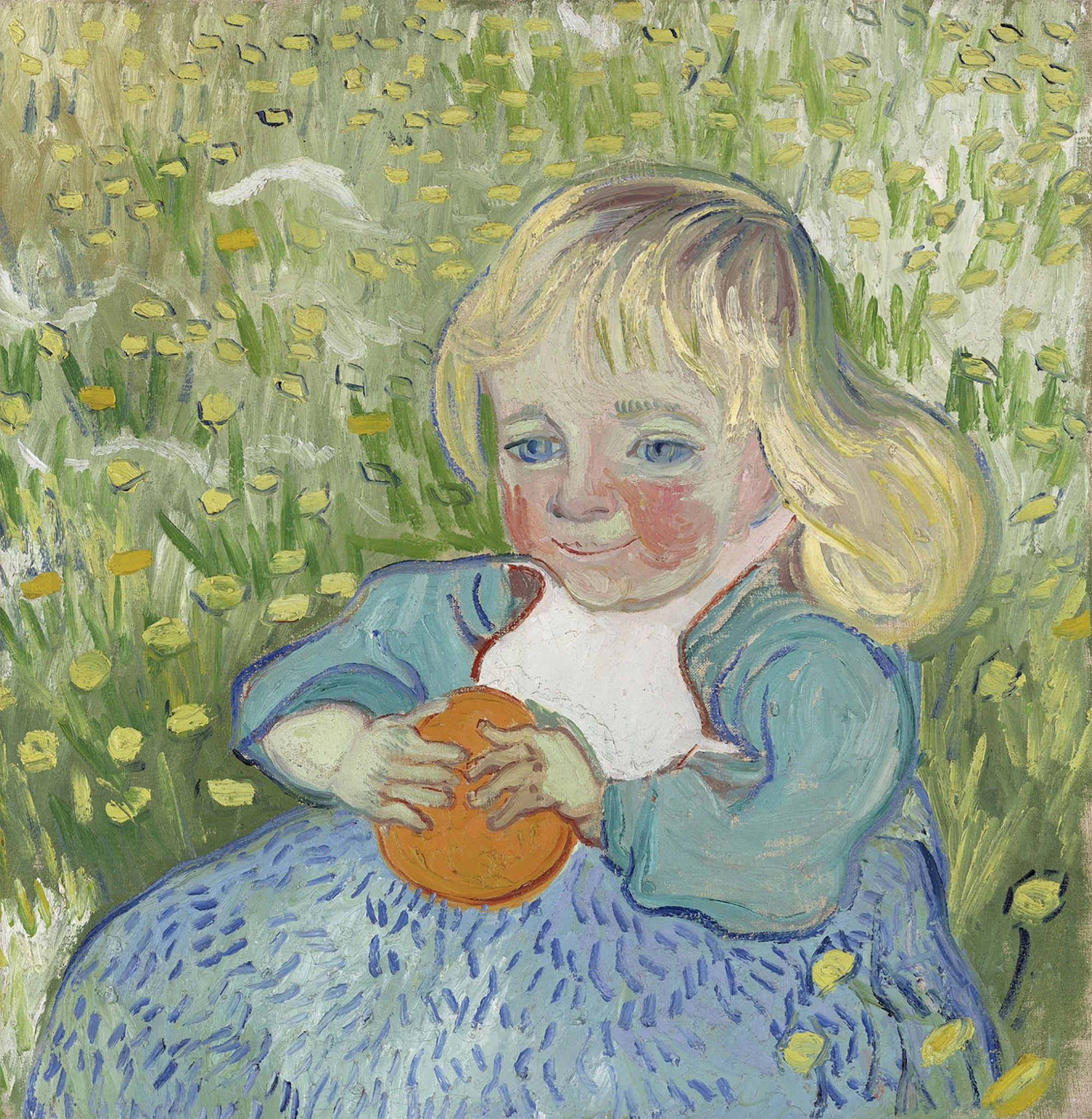
Child with Orange, June–July 1890, Private Collection (F785)

=== Girl in White ===
Girl in White also known as Young Girl Standing Against a Background of Wheat and Woman in a Cornfield was painted by Vincent van Gogh in 1890 in Auvers-sur-Oise, France, during the last months of his life. Girl in White has been part of the Chester Dale Collection in the National Gallery of Art, Washington D.C. since 1963.

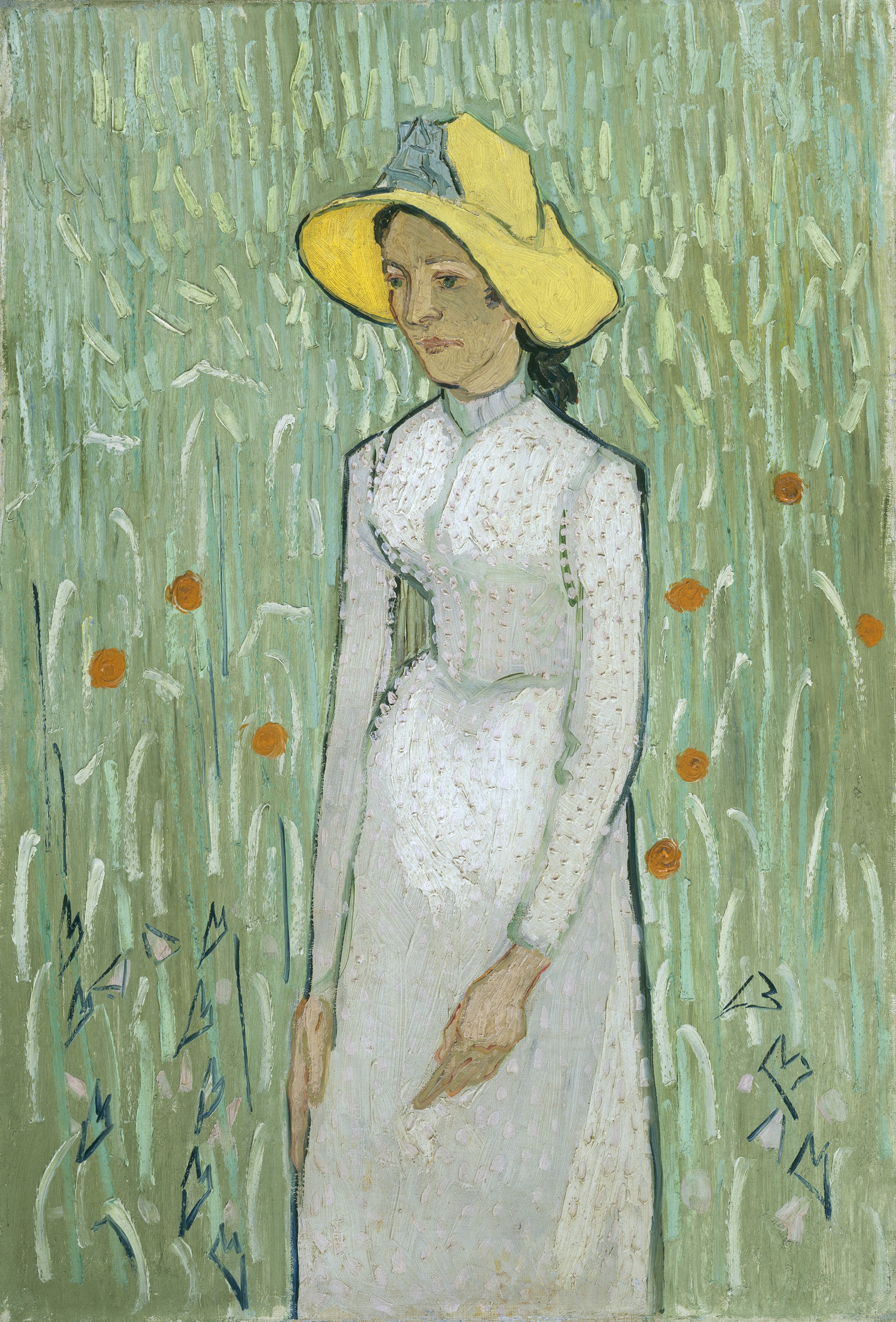

=== Little Arlesienne ===
The Little Arlesienne (Head of a Girl) is found at the Kröller-Müller Museum. See also Paintings of Children (Van Gogh series).

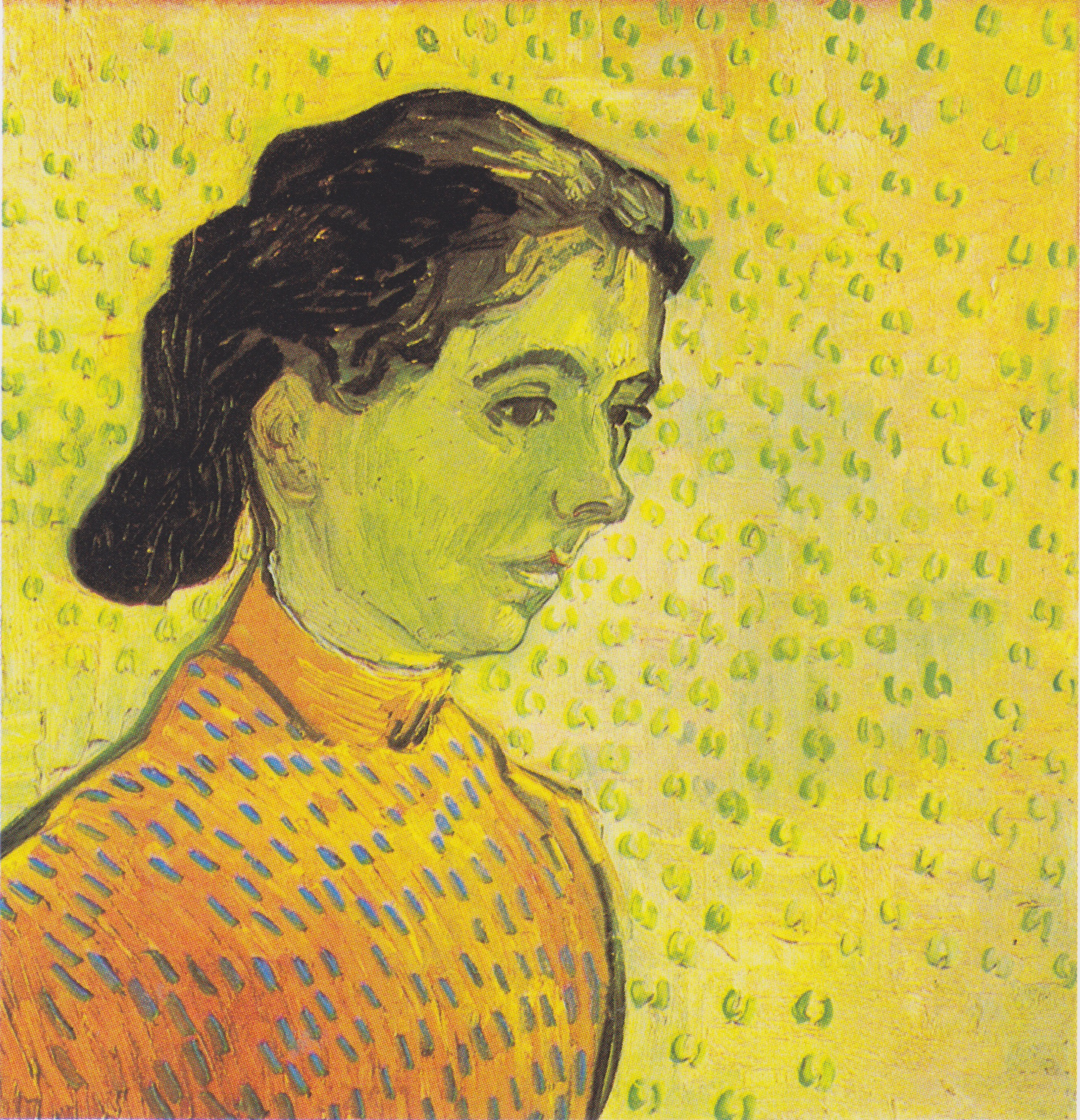
The Little Arlesienne (Head of a Girl)
1890
Kröller-Müller Museum, Otterlo, Netherlands (F518)

=== Young Peasant Woman with Straw Hat ===
Peasant Woman Against a Background of Wheat is an 1890 painting by Vincent van Gogh. Van Gogh went on to paint several versions of this painting. The painting has changed hands several times. In 1997, Stephen Wynn paid $47.5 million for the painting. On October 7, 2005, it was announced that Stephen Wynn had sold the painting along with Gauguin's Bathers to Steven A. Cohen for more than $100 million.

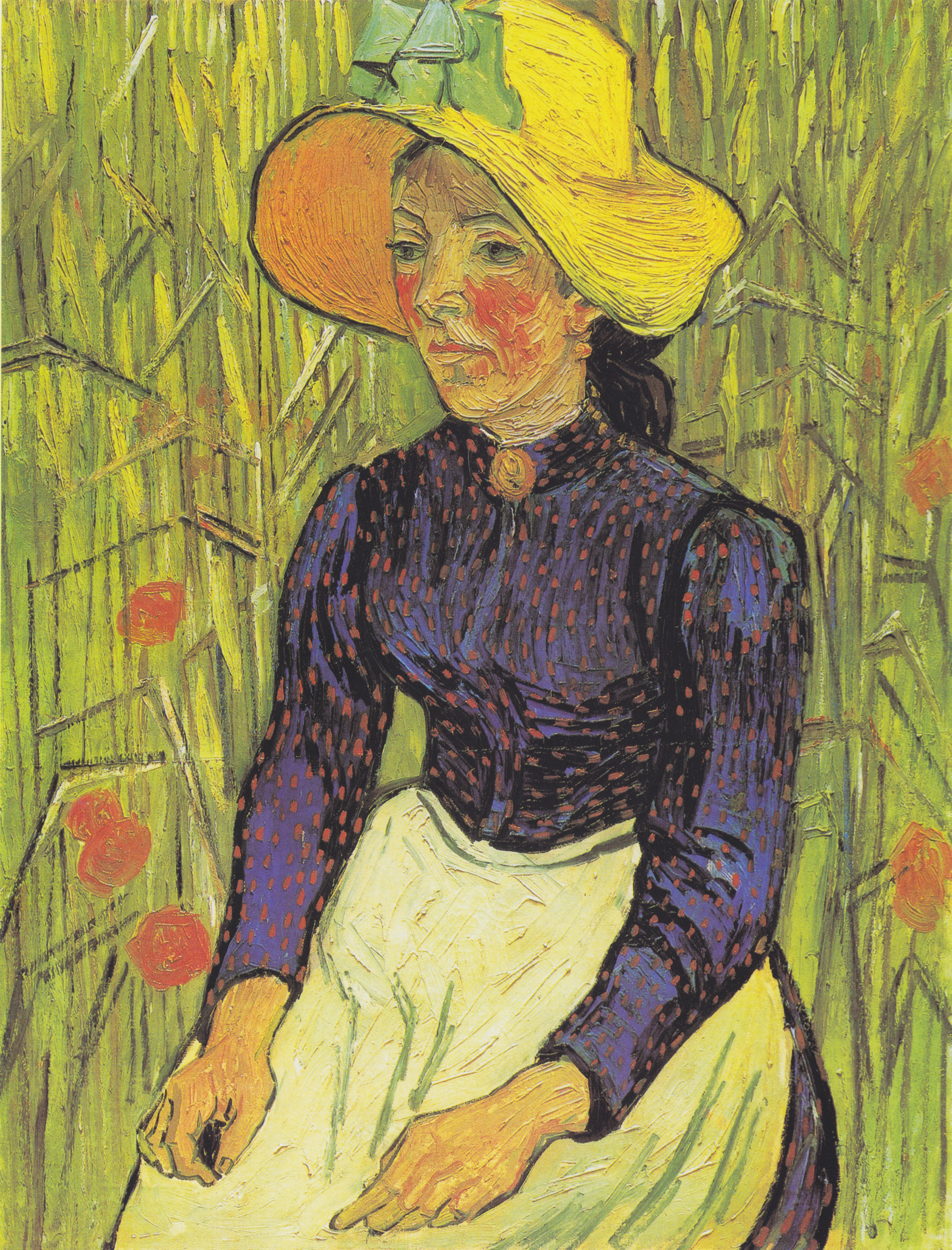
Young Peasant Woman with Straw Hat Sitting in the Wheat
June 1890
Private Collection (F774)

=== Two Children ===
Two Young Girls, also called Two Children is owned by Musée d'Orsay, Paris. Another version of Two Children is part of a private collection (F784). See also Paintings of Children (Van Gogh series).

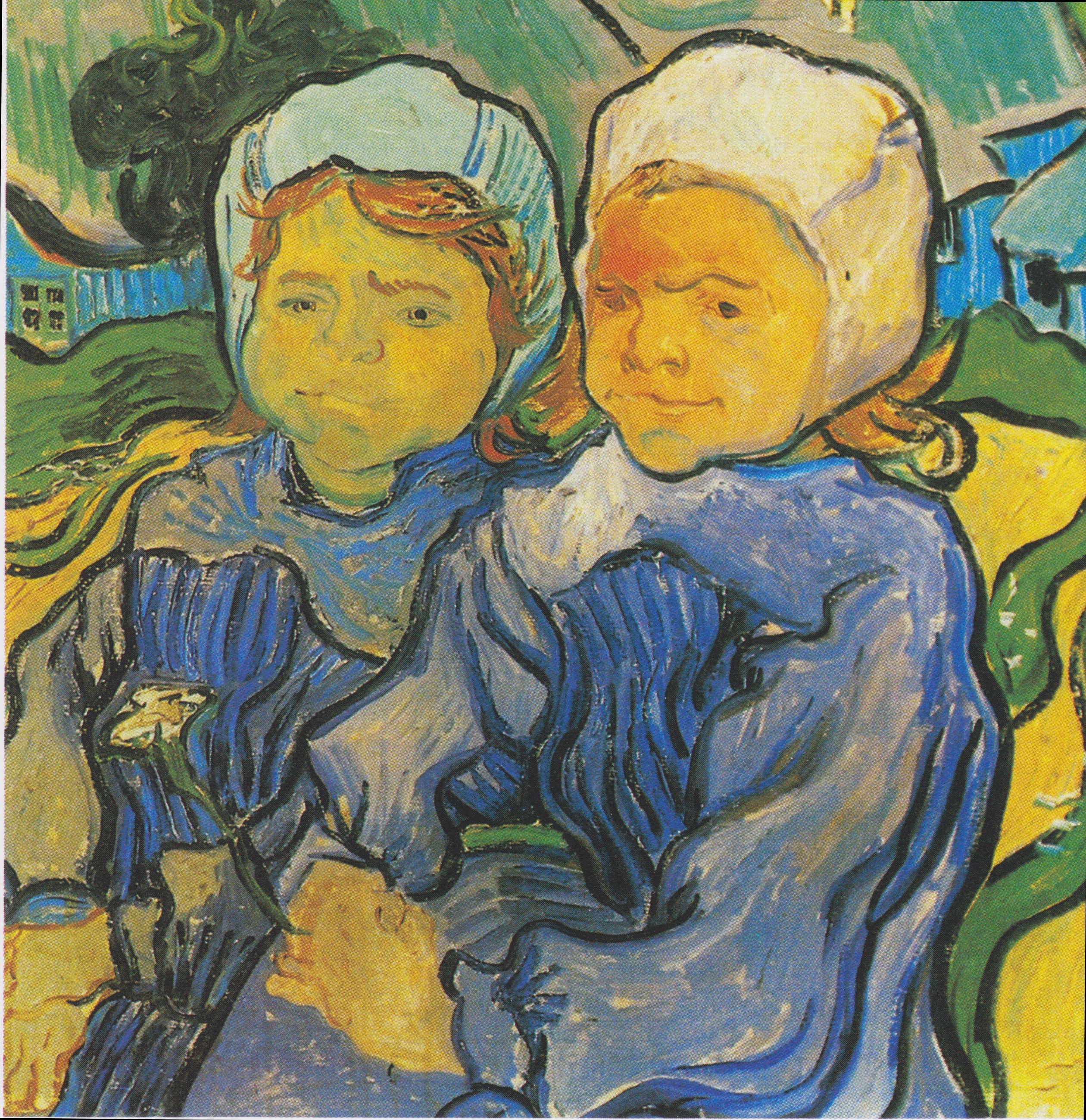
Two Young Girls or Two Children, 1890, Musée d'Orsay, Paris, France (F783)

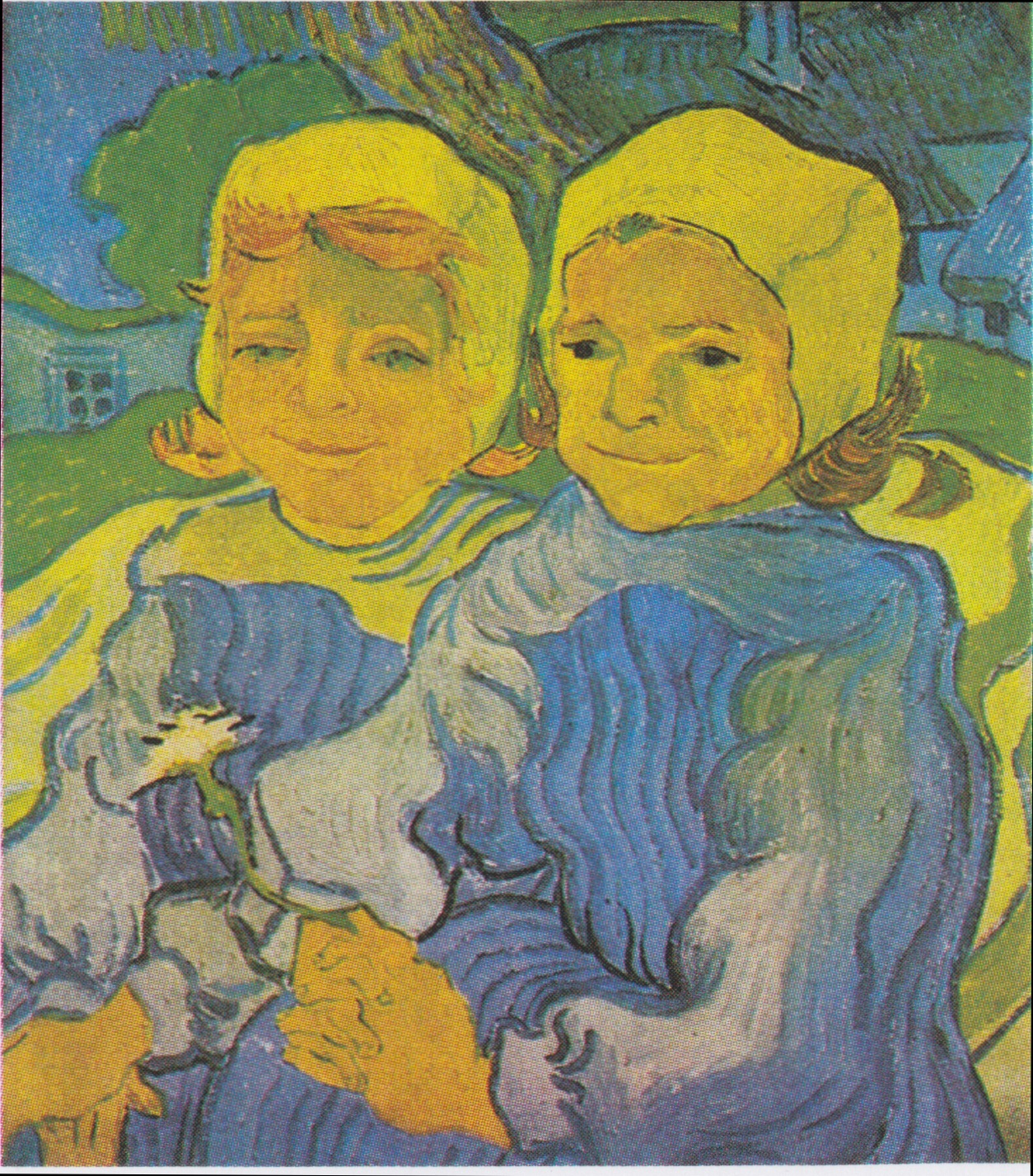
Two Children, 1890, Private Collection (F784)

=== Young Man with Cornflower ===
The Young Man with Cornflower was made in June 1890 in Auvers. See also Paintings of Children (Van Gogh series).

Young Man with Cornflower
June 1890
Private collection, (F787)

== See also ==
- List of works by Vincent van Gogh

== Resources ==
=== References ===
- Van Gogh Face to Face: The Portraits, with contributions by Roland Dorn, George S. Keyes, Joseph J. Rishel with Katherine Sachs, George T. M. Shackelford, Lauren Soth, Judy Sund, and a chronology by Katherine Sachs, Detroit Institute of Arts & Thames and Hudson, 2000 ISBN 0-89558-153-1

== See also ==
- List of works by Vincent van Gogh
- Self-portraits by Vincent van Gogh
- Paintings of Children (Van Gogh series)
