= A Girl in the Street, Two Coaches in the Background =

Painting by Vincent van Gogh

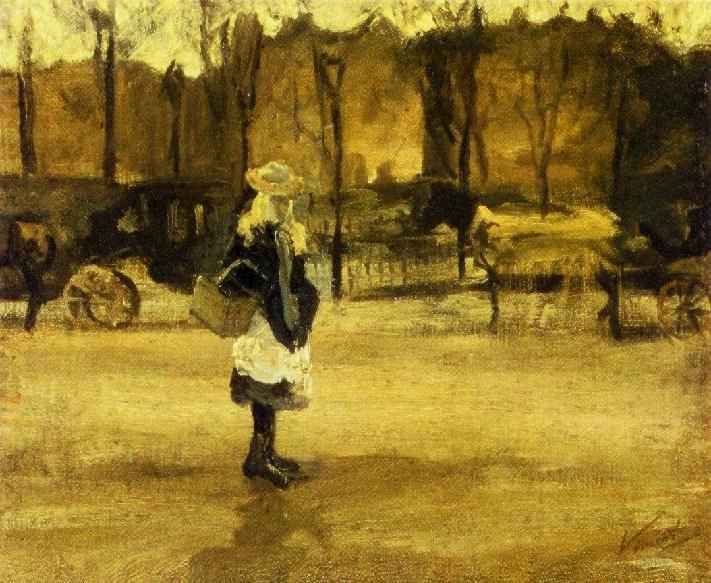
- Artist: Vincent van Gogh
- Year: 1882
- Catalogue: F13; JH179
- Medium: Oil on canvas on panel
- Dimensions: 42.0 cm × 53.0 cm (16.5 in × 20.9 in)
- Location: Villa Flora; Winterthur

A Girl in the Street, Two Coaches in the Background (F13, JH179) is an oil painting by Vincent van Gogh. It is one of his very early works, painted in The Hague in August 1882, at a time when his brother Theo was encouraging him to paint landscapes in colour, rather than drawing figures. It is an early work to bear his "Vincent" signature, suggesting he was happy with the effect.

== Background ==
In one summer day, Gogh found two horse-carried coaches at the end of a strip of trees. Quickly setting up his easel, Gogh found a teen girl strolling around the road, with Gogh quickly including the teen girl in the painting. Eventually creating the painting.

== Description ==
The work in an evening scene of a young blonde woman, with straw hat, dark jacket and skirt, and white apron, carrying a basket as she walks along a dirt road past two horse-drawn carriages which are waiting beside some trees, with some buildings visible beyond.

It measures 42 by 53 centimetres (17 in × 21 in). It was bought by Arthur Hahnloser before 1913, and is still in the private collection at the Villa Flora in Winterthur.

== See also ==
- Paintings of Children (Van Gogh series)
- List of works by Vincent van Gogh
