= Boy Cutting Grass with a Sickle =

1881 watercolor painting by Vincent van Gogh

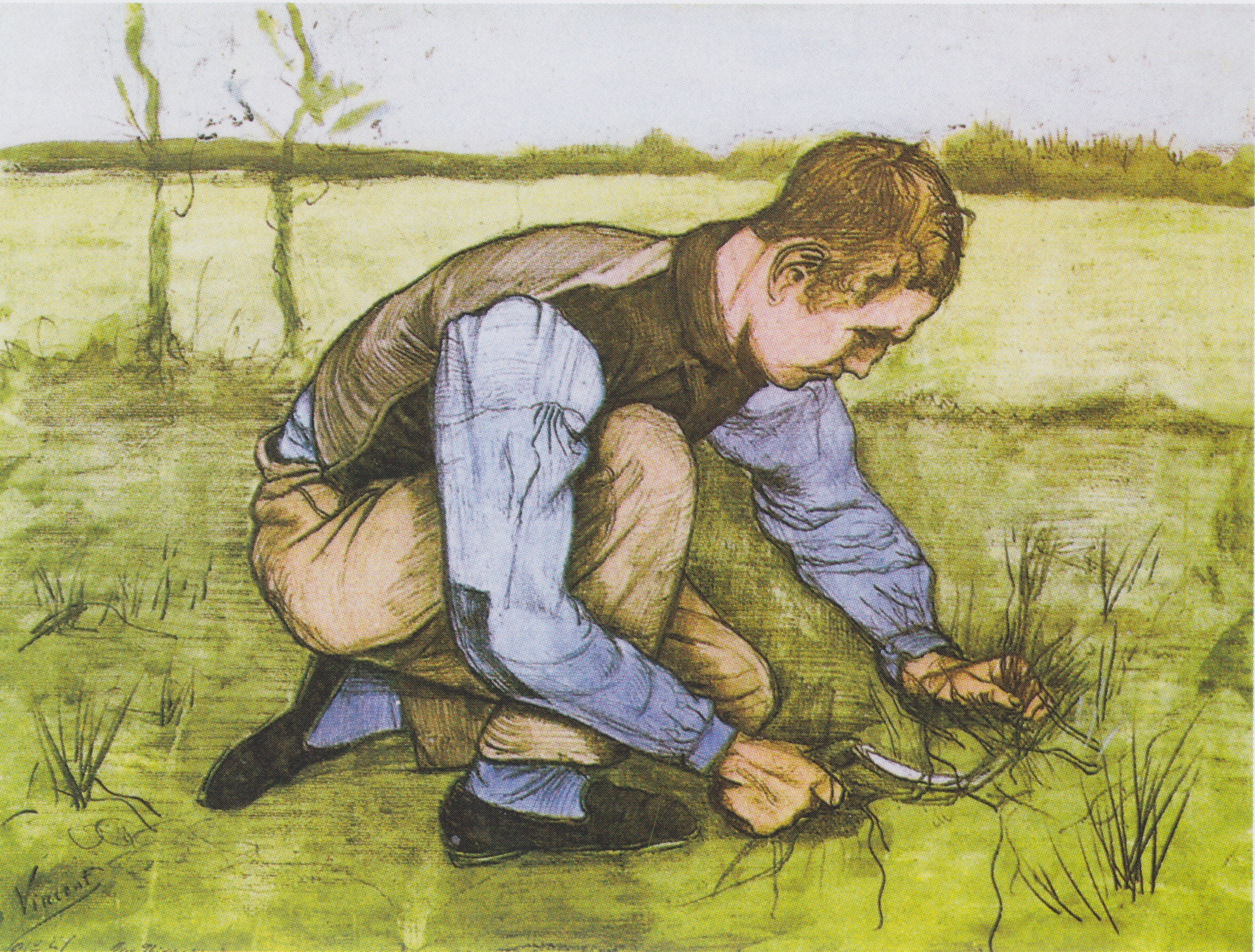
- Artist: Vincent van Gogh
- Year: October 1881
- Medium: Opaque watercolour on laid paper
- Dimensions: 47 cm × 61 cm (19 in × 24 in)
- Location: Kröller-Müller Museum; Netherlands

Boy Cutting Grass with a Sickle is a watercolor painting created in 1881 by Vincent van Gogh. It is owned by the Kröller-Müller Museum.

== See also ==
- Early works of Vincent van Gogh
- List of works by Vincent van Gogh
- Paintings of Children (Van Gogh series)
